= Battle of Montmirail =

1814 battle during the War of the Sixth Coalition

- Part of the Six Days' Campaign within the Campaign of France of the Sixth Coalition
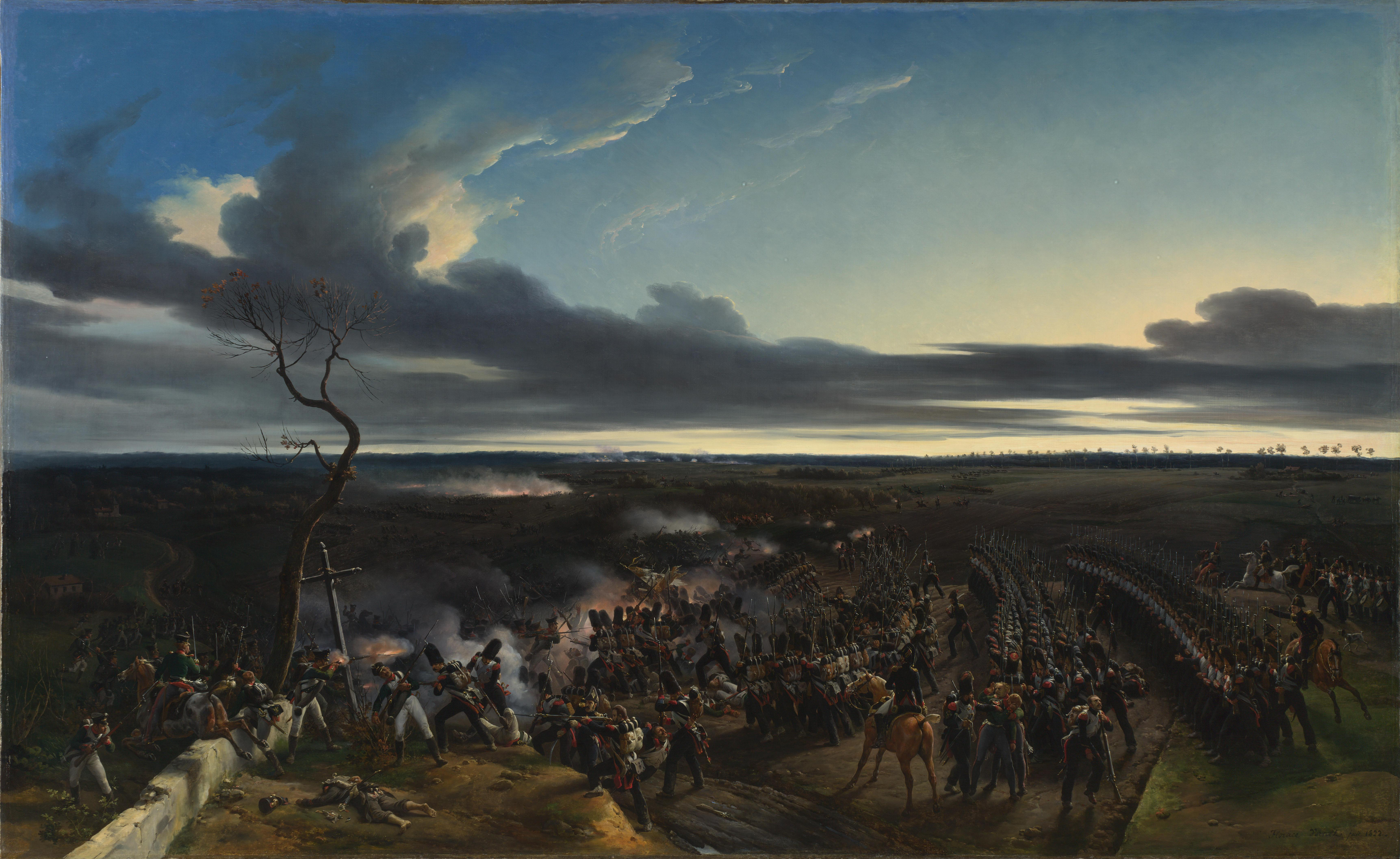
- The Battle of Montmirail by Horace Vernet
Date	11 February 1814
Location	Montmirail, French Empire 48.8958°N 3.4807°E
Result	French victory

Belligerents
(First French Empire) France	(Russian Empire) Russia (Kingdom of Prussia) Prussia

Commanders and leaders
(First French Empire) Napoleon Bonaparte	(Russian Empire) Fabian Osten-Sacken (Kingdom of Prussia) Ludwig von Yorck

Strength
13,000 (Note: "In den Kampf kamen…")–20,000	Russia: 18,000, 90 guns Prussia: 9,000, 16 guns Total: 23,000 (Note: "In den Kampf kamen…")–27,000, 106 guns

Casualties and losses
2,000–2,100	Russia: 2,800, 9–26 guns Prussia: 900 Total casualties: 3,700–4,000, 9–26 guns
- Location within France

War of the Sixth Coalition:
Campaign in north-east France
current battle
Napoleon in command
Napoleon not in command

The Battle of Montmirail (11 February 1814) was fought between a French force led by Emperor Napoleon and two Allied corps commanded by Fabian Wilhelm von Osten-Sacken and Ludwig Yorck von Wartenburg. In hard fighting that lasted until evening, French troops including the Imperial Guard defeated Sacken's Russian soldiers and compelled them to retreat to the north. Part of Yorck's Prussian I Corps tried to intervene in the struggle but it was also driven off. The battle occurred near Montmirail, France, during the Six Days Campaign of the Napoleonic Wars. Montmirail is located 51 kilometres (32 mi) east of Meaux.

After Napoleon crushed Zakhar Dmitrievich Olsufiev's small isolated corps in the Battle of Champaubert on 10 February, he found himself in the midst of Gebhard Leberecht von Blücher's widely-spread Army of Silesia. Leaving a small force in the east to watch Blücher, Napoleon turned the bulk of his army to the west in an attempt to destroy Sacken. Unaware of the size of Napoleon's army, Sacken tried to smash his way east to join Blücher. The Russians managed to hold their ground for several hours, but were forced back as more and more French soldiers appeared on the battlefield. Yorck's troops belatedly arrived only to be repulsed, but the Prussians distracted the French long enough to allow Sacken's Russians to join them in a withdrawal to the north. The following day would see the Battle of Château-Thierry as Napoleon launched an all-out pursuit.

== Background ==
On the 1st of February 1814, Prussian Field Marshal Gebhard Leberecht von Blücher commanding 80,000 Allied soldiers from his own Army of Silesia and Austrian field marshal Karl Philipp, Prince of Schwarzenberg's Army of Bohemia defeated Napoleon with 45,000 French troops in the Battle of La Rothière. Elated by their triumph, the Allied commanders devised a new plan whereby Schwarzenberg advanced from Troyes toward Paris while Blücher operated on a more northerly axis from Châlons-sur-Marne toward Meaux. The two armies would be linked by Peter Wittgenstein's corps and a scouting force led by Alexander Nikitich Seslavin. Within a few days the cautious Schwarzenberg began pulling Wittgenstein's troops to the south. Believing the war was almost over, Blücher pressed rapidly west after a smaller French force under Marshal Jacques MacDonald. Unknown to the Prussian field marshal, on 5 February Schwarzenberg switched Seslavin's force from the right flank to the extreme left flank without informing Blücher. Since he lacked a liaison officer with Seslavin, the Prussian was unaware that a dangerous gap yawned on his left flank.

Until 6 February, Napoleon planned to strike a blow against the Army of Bohemia. But that day the French emperor received intelligence that Blücher was moving on Paris, via Meaux. Since MacDonald was too weak to stop Army of Silesia, Napoleon was compelled to deal with Blücher first. While sending out patrols to determine the precise whereabouts of the Prussian field marshal's army, Napoleon sent Marshal Auguste de Marmont with 8,000 troops to Sézanne. On 8 February these were joined by part of the Imperial Guard and a large force of cavalry. On the same day MacDonald's patrols reported that Ludwig Yorck von Wartenburg was near Épernay with 18,000 men. When, on the morning of 9 February, Napoleon received news from Marmont that Fabian Wilhelm von Osten-Sacken was near Montmirail with about 15,000 troops, the French army lurched into action.

Marshal Claude Perrin Victor with 14,000 men, consisting of his own corps, a force under Etienne Maurice Gérard and cavalry, would hold Nogent-sur-Seine. Marshal Nicolas Oudinot with 20,000 men including the newly formed VII Corps, a 5,000-man Young Guard division, National Guards and a cavalry force under Pierre Claude Pajol was instructed to guard the bridges at Bray-sur-Seine, Montereau, Pont-sur-Yonne and Sens. At this time, Napoleon had only 70,000 soldiers to confront about 200,000 Allies. With Victor and Oudinot watching Schwarzenberg, Napoleon decided to act against Blücher who he assumed to have 45,000 troops.

In fact, the Army of Silesia had 57,000 soldiers, including 18,000 under Yorck at Château-Thierry, 20,000 under Sacken near La Ferté-sous-Jouarre and 19,000 under Zakhar Dmitrievich Olsufiev, Peter Mikhailovich Kaptzevich and Friedrich von Kleist at Champaubert, Vertus and Bergères-lès-Vertus. However, Blücher's army was spread across a front of 44 miles (71 km) and Napoleon might count on the help of the 10,000 men under MacDonald. Napoleon striking force numbered 30,000 men and 120 guns. It consisted of Marmont's corps, two Young Guard divisions led by Marshal Michel Ney, the I Cavalry Corps, two Old Guard divisions under Marshal Édouard Mortier, duc de Trévise, part of the Guard Cavalry and Jean-Marie Defrance's independent cavalry division. Mortier was ordered to bring up the rear.

Fearing that Napoleon would offer battle near Nogent, Schwarzenberg asked his colleague Blücher to send Kleist's corps south to help. Obligingly, the Prussian field marshal ordered Kleist, Kaptzevich and Olsufiev to converge on Sézanne on 10 February. Riding with Kleist and Kaptzevich, Blücher led them south from Vertus toward Fère-Champenoise, planning to turn west from there to Sézanne. After days of rain, the roads were swamped, but the French country people assisted the army in dragging Napoleon's cannons through the mud. The French army fell on Olsufiev's small corps with crushing force in the Battle of Champaubert on 10 February. With only 5,000 men and 24 guns, the Russian general unwisely held his ground; Olsufiev ended the day as a French prisoner and his corps was nearly destroyed. The 1,500 survivors were formed into three or four ad hoc battalions.

== Battle ==
=== Advance to contact ===
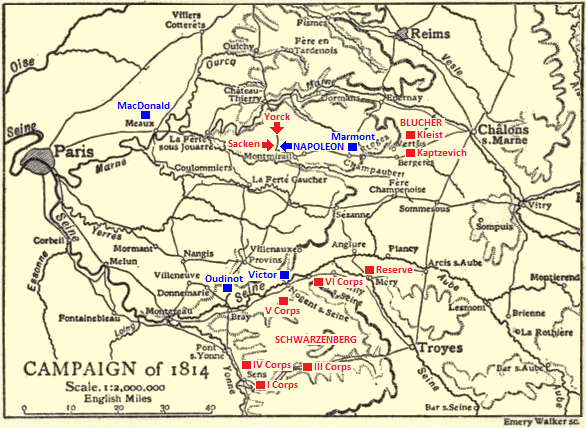
Napoleon battles Sacken and Yorck near Montmirail on 11 February 1814.

Blücher was near Fère-Champenoise when heard that Olsufiev's corps had been wrecked; he immediately ordered Kleist and Kaptzevich to undertake a night march back to Vertus. The Prussian field marshal ordered Yorck to march to Montmirail while holding the important bridge over the Marne River at Château-Thierry in case a retreat was necessary. During 10 February, Sacken advanced west to Trilport where there was a bridge over the Marne. Blücher recalled Sacken, instructing him to march east to Montmirail to rendezvous with Yorck, then clear the highway between there and Vertus. Blücher neglected to mention anything to Sacken about escaping over the Marne.

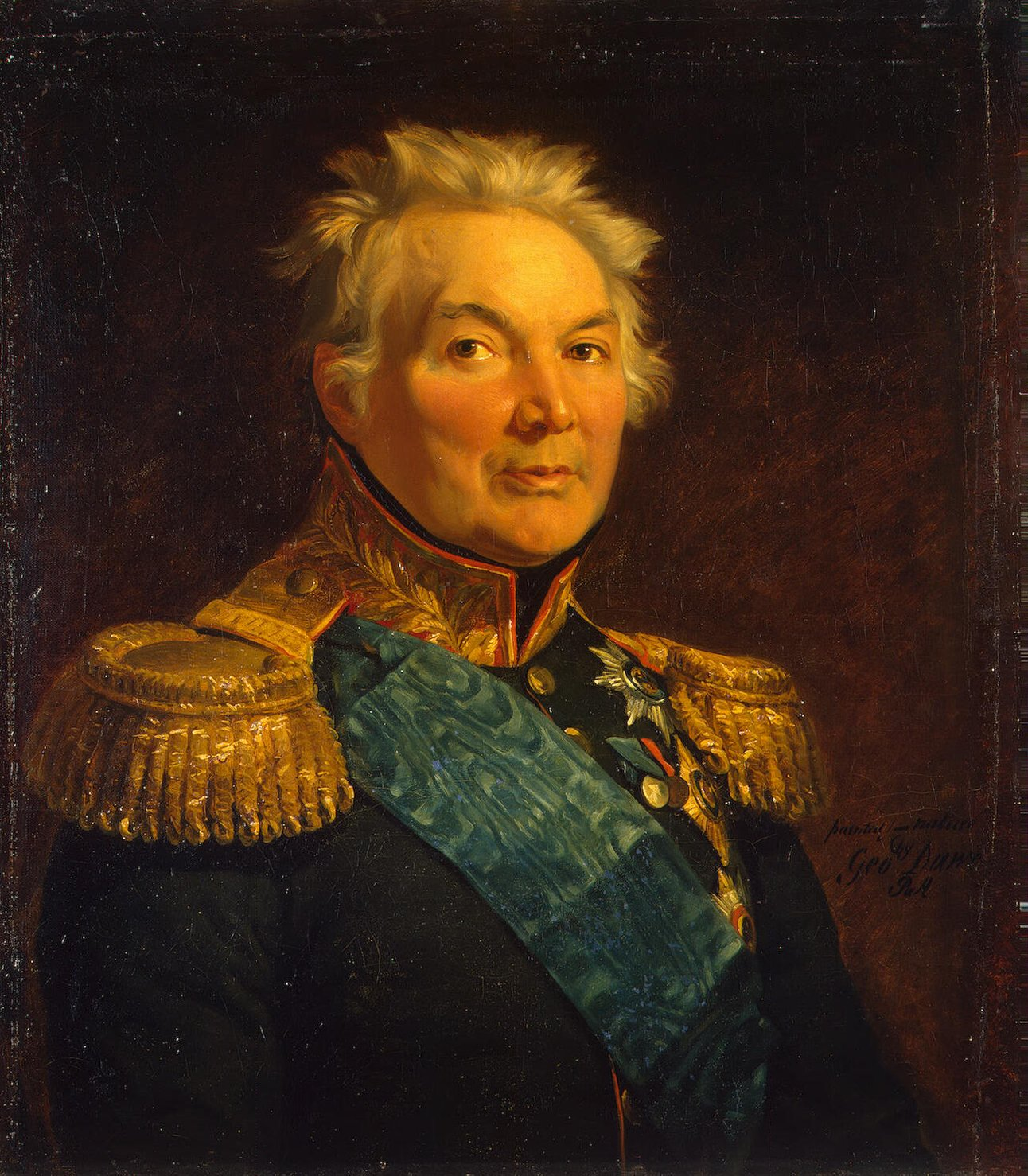
F. Osten-Sacken

Napoleon ordered MacDonald to move east from Trilport. At 7:00 pm, the emperor instructed Étienne Marie Antoine Champion de Nansouty with two divisions of cavalry to march west to capture Montmirail, followed at 3:00 am by Étienne Pierre Sylvestre Ricard's division of Marmont's corps. Ney's Young Guard divisions would move in their wake at 6:00 am while Mortier's Old Guard would march directly from Sézanne to Montmirail. Jean François Leval's division was detached from Oudinot and ordered to march to Montmirail via La Ferté-Gaucher. Napoleon posted Marmont at Étoges with Joseph Lagrange's division and the I Cavalry Corps. Using his central position, Napoleon hoped to smash Sacken and Yorck while they were isolated from Blücher. Accordingly, he ordered MacDonald to retake Château-Thierry and its vital bridge while Marmont kept an eye on Blücher.

Yorck sent a dispatch to Blücher expressing doubt whether he could join Sacken at Montmirail because his soldiers were too worn out to march on the night of 10–11 February. Instead, Yorck promised to move south to Viffort on the road to Montmirail. When he received his orders, Sacken destroyed the bridge at La Ferté-sous-Jouarre and began marching east at 9:00 pm on the 10th. By 9:00 am the following day, Russian corps commander's leading elements were clashing with French patrols east of Viels-Maisons. The French had driven Sacken's Cossacks under Akim Akimovich Karpov out of Montmirail early that morning. At 9:00 am Yorck reached Viffort and was skirmishing with French cavalry. With the La Ferté-sous-Jouarre bridge broken to the west and unknown forces looming to the east, Sacken was in serious danger of becoming trapped. Understanding this, Yorck sent a staff officer to his Russian colleague to warn him that his Prussians would be late to the battlefield. Due to the muddy roads, the heavy Prussian field guns and a brigade had to be left behind. Yorck's messenger recommended that Sacken retreat north to Château-Thierry.

Sacken would have none of it. Against the advice of his own staff who urged him to move closer to Yorck, the Russian commander deployed his army corps with its main weight to the south. Strictly following his orders, Sacken determined to smash his way east through Montmirail. At the start of the battle Napoleon was significantly outnumbered and could only defend with 5,000 Old Guard infantry, 4,500 cavalry, Ricard's division and 36 guns. Because of the bad condition of the roads and the exhaustion of the soldiers, it was not clear whether French reinforcements or Yorck's Prussians would first arrive on the field. Napoleon was taking a huge risk.

=== Deployment ===
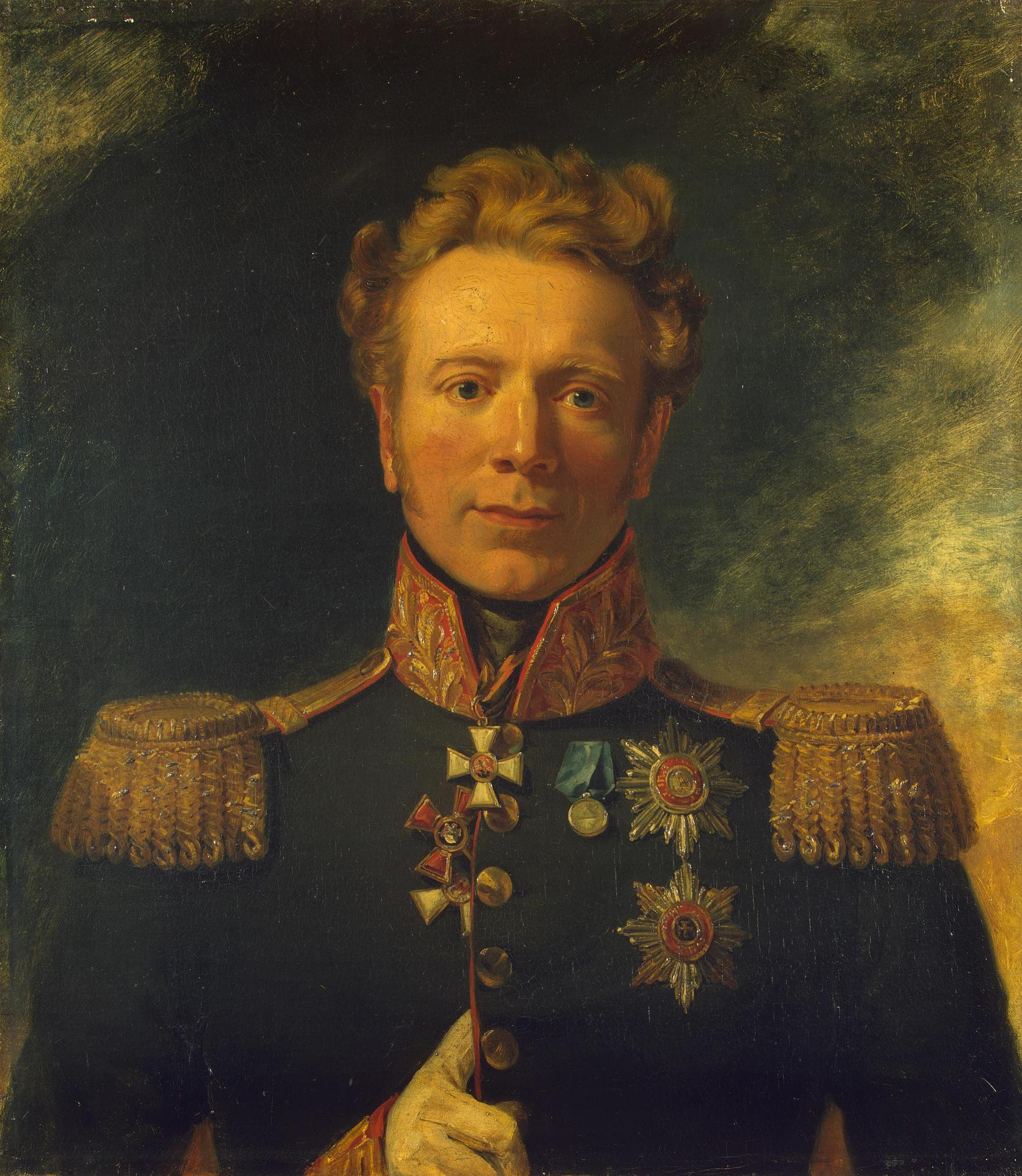
Ivan A. Lieven

Sacken's strength was variously given as 18,000 men and 90 guns by David G. Chandler, 14,000 soldiers and 80 guns by George Nafziger, and 18,000 soldiers by Francis Loraine Petre. Prussian staff officer Karl Freiherr von Müffling credited the Russians with 20,000 troops while another German officer counted 16,300 men and 90 guns. Sacken led two infantry and one cavalry corps. The foot soldiers belonged to Alexander Ivanovich Tallisin's VI Corps with the 7th and 18th Infantry Divisions and Ivan Andreievich Lieven's XI Corps with the 10th and 27th Infantry Divisions and a brigade from the 16th Division. The cavalry corps included Sergei Nicholaevich Lanskoi's 2nd Hussar Division and Semyon Davydovich Pandschulishev's 3rd Dragoon Division. Artillery chief Alexey Petrovich Nikitin directed three batteries of 12-pound cannons and four batteries of 6-pounders. Tallisin was acting corps commander in place of Alexei Grigorievich Scherbatov who was ill. The cavalry corps was directed by Ilarion Vasilievich Vasilshikov.

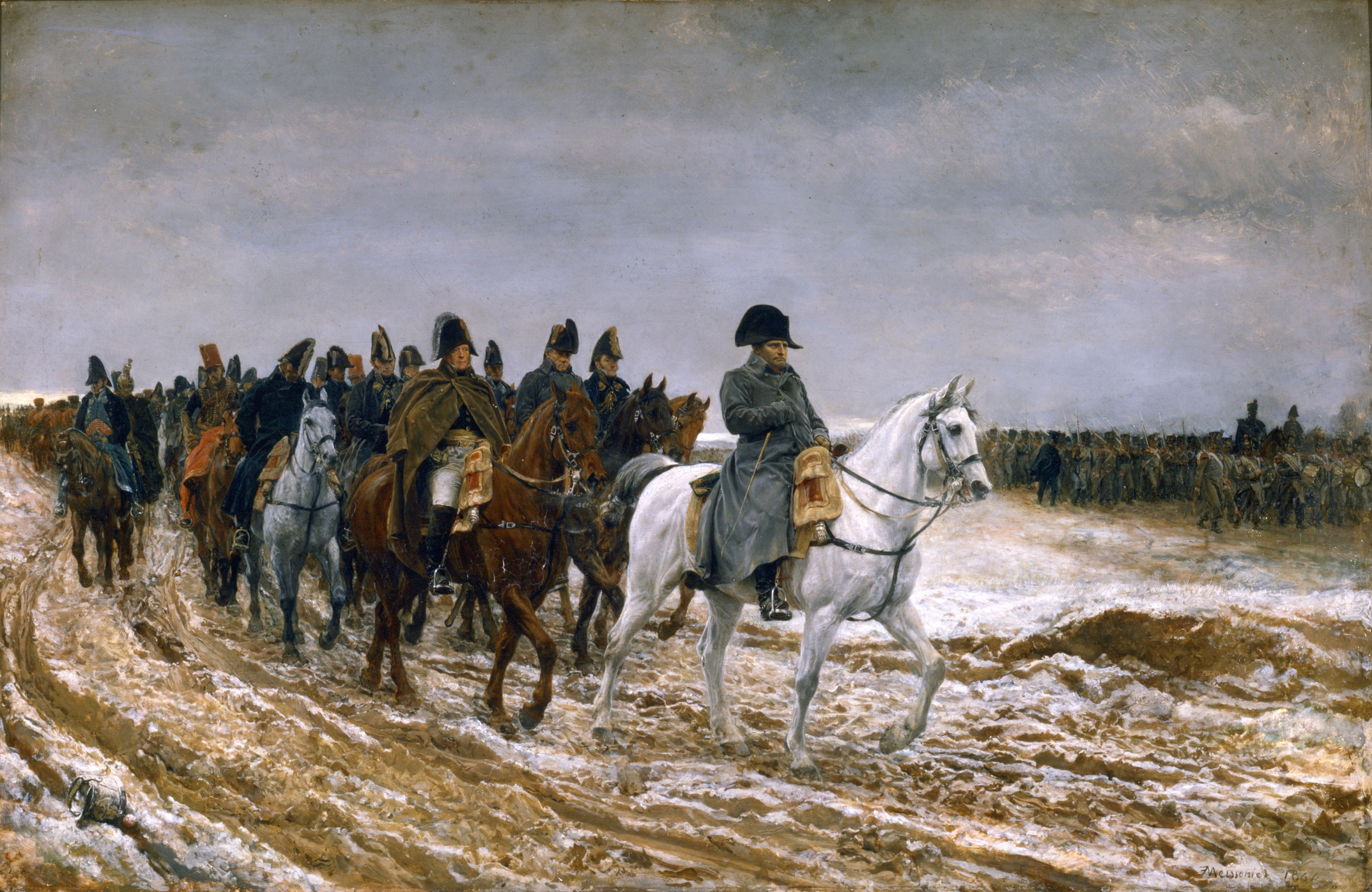
Napoleon, shown with his marshals and staff, leads his army over roads made muddy by days of rain. Though his empire was crumbling, Napoleon proved to be a dangerous opponent in the Six Days Campaign.

According to Chandler and Petre, Napoleon's greatest strength during the battle was 20,000 men. Nafziger arrived at a larger total of 27,153 soldiers. The cavalry was made up of the 2,582 troopers of the 1st Guard Cavalry Division under Pierre David de Colbert-Chabanais, the 2,164 sabers of the 3rd Guard Cavalry Division under Louis Marie Levesque de Laferrière and the 896 horsemen of Defrance's division. The infantry numbered 4,133 men from Claude Marie Meunier's 1st Young Guard Division, 2,840 soldiers from Philibert Jean-Baptiste Curial's 2nd Young Guard Division, 4,796 men from Louis Friant's 1st Old Guard Division, 3,878 soldiers from Claude-Étienne Michel's 2nd Old Guard Division and 2,917 men from Ricard's 8th Infantry Division. Finally, Charles Lefebvre-Desnouettes led either 3,535 horsemen from the 2nd Guard Cavalry Division or 4,947 infantry from the 3rd Young Guard Division.

The Petit Morin River flows west on the southern margin of the battlefield, which was mostly rolling terrain covered by several woods. Just north of the Petit Morin there was a forest which anchored the French left flank. On the northern fringe of the forest was the village of Marchais-en-Brie with a north-south stream a little to the west. Farther north was the east-west highway. Napoleon placed Ricard's division in columns east of Marchais. Two of Ricard's battalions were detached and posted north of the highway in the Bailly Wood. Behind Ricard were Ney's two Young Guard divisions under Meunier and Curial. In reserve was Friant's division in battalion columns at 100-pace intervals. To keep Sacken and Yorck from linking up, the French emperor deployed Friant's division where the Château-Thierry road met the main east-west highway, with Defrance's cavalry on his right. Farther north, blocking the Château-Thierry road was Nansouty who had overall command of the Guard cavalry divisions.

Sacken posted Tallisin's corps to the south with the 7th Division on the right and the 18th Division in the center. On the north, but still south of the highway was Lieven's corps with the 10th Division in the center and the 27th Division on the left. The infantry was arrayed in two lines with each battalion in column. Three lines of skirmishers deployed in front and the light artillery was posted on the flanks of the infantry. The 12-pounders of Battery Nr. 18 were positioned in the center between the 10th and 18th Divisions while the other two heavy batteries were kept in reserve. The Russians massed 36 guns on the west side of the ravine. According to one account, Lieven's corps was in reserve west of the village of L'Épine-aux-Bois. Vasilshikov's cavalry was arranged to the left of Lieven's infantry near the highway.

=== Combat ===
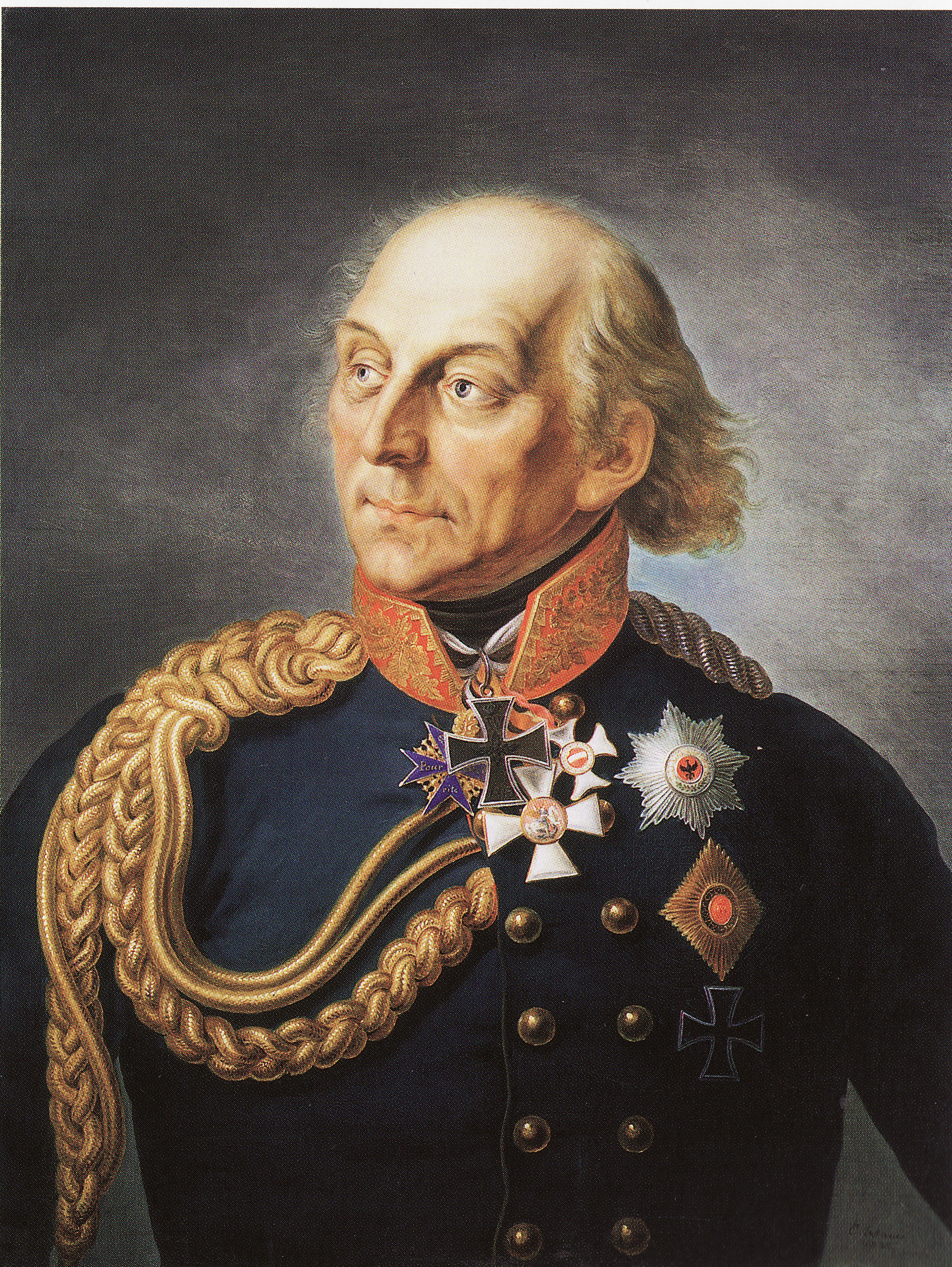
Ludwig von Yorck

Sacken created a 2,360-man task force under General-major Heidenreich that included the Pskov, Vladimir, Kostroma and Tambov Infantry Regiments, two companies of the 11th Jägers, the Lukovkin Cossack Regiment and six guns. Except for the guns which were unable to cross the stream, Heidenreich's troops moved east and seized Marchais at about 11:00 am. More French artillery having arrived in the interval, Napoleon ordered Ricard to attack Marchais at noon. A bitter struggle for Marchais raged for two hours, with the Russians retaining control of the village. Napoleon ordered an artillery bombardment while he waited for Michel's Old Guard division to march forward from Montmirail. At 2:00 pm the emperor ordered an attack on Sacken's left flank. Four of Friant's Old Guard battalions marched west along the highway toward Haute-Épine dairy farm, supported on their right by seven squadrons of Gardes d'Honneur. At the same time, Claude-Étienne Guyot led four Guard cavalry squadrons around the Russian left flank. The combined attacks broke Sacken's first line and compelled him to send his second line into action while moving his cavalry to the left to get in contact with Yorck's Prussians.

To break the connection with Yorck, Napoleon ordered a new attack straight down the highway by Nansouty with all three of his divisions, Colbert, Desnouettes and Laferrière. This charge broke up some Russian formations, forcing the soldiers to scatter into the Viels-Maisons woods. Vasilshikov's cavalry counterattacked, forcing Nansouty's horsemen back and restoring the link with the Prussians. By this time Meunier's Young Guard division joined Ricard's in the fighting for Marchais on Napoleon's left flank. The French captured Marchais twice before being driven out again when Sacken's 18th Division recaptured the village.

At either 3:00 pm or 3:30 pm Otto Karl Lorenz von Pirch's 1st Infantry Brigade and Heinrich Wilhelm von Horn's 7th Infantry Brigade arrived at Fontenelle-en-Brie on the Château-Thierry highway. Because of the poor condition of the roads, the Prussians only had brigade Batteries Nrs. 2 and 3 armed with 6-pounders. The heavier cannons were left behind with the 8th Brigade at Château-Thierry. Fearing the appearance of MacDonald's forces in his right rear, Yorck also sent his remaining infantry brigade back to hold Château-Thierry. The Prussian reserve cavalry deployed near Fontenelle though it lacked its artillery. Pirch deployed his brigade in two lines between Fontenelle and the hamlet of Tourneux farther east. After waiting for Horn's brigade to close up behind him, Pirch began attacking toward the Bailly and Plenois woods. Sacken ordered his two reserve heavy batteries to support the Prussian advance. At the same time, Michel's Old Guard division reached the battlefield and was committed to the fight against Yorck.

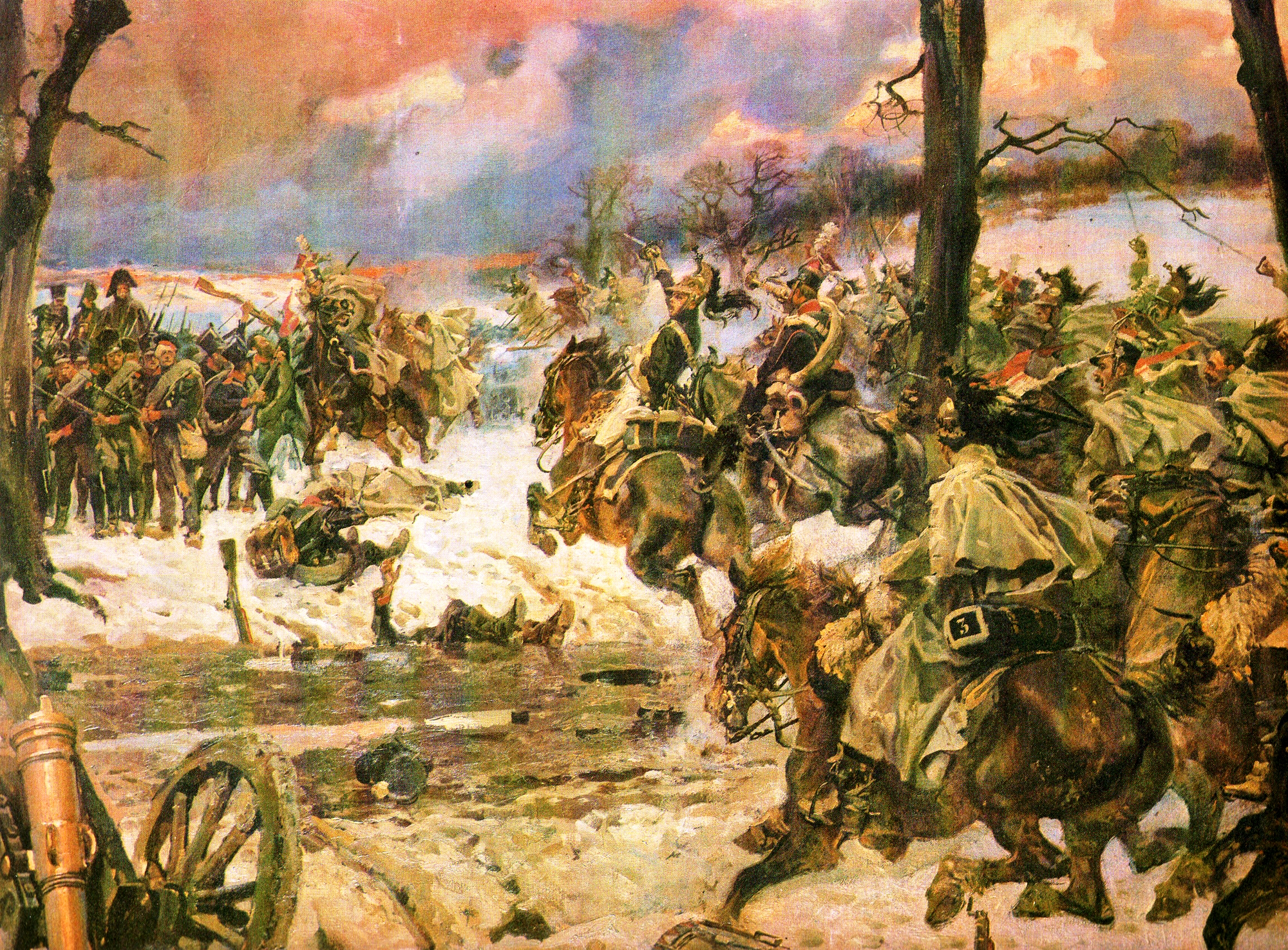
French cavalry charging Russian squares at Montmirail.

Napoleon ordered the tired soldiers of Ricard and Meunier back into the battle for Marchais. The emperor sent Marshal François Joseph Lefebvre with two battalions of Old Guard Foot Chasseurs to cut off Marchais from the north. Ricard organized a four-battalion attack from the hamlet of Pomesson in the south. Lefebvre's two battalions captured L'Épine-aux-Bois. Though the French achieved local artillery superiority, the Russians in Marchais continued to resist until 5:00 pm when they were forced to relinquish control of the village and pull back. When they reached the west side of the ravine, Defrance's cavalry charged into them, inflicting heavy losses on the brigades of Dietrich and Blagovenzenko. Several hundred Russian skirmishers near Marchais were either cut down or captured. Realizing that without control of Marchais, the battle was lost, Sacken began pulling back his artillery from the right wing toward the center. Near the highway, Russian infantry squares were charged by French cavalry, but they were able to escape when their own cavalry intervened. The Sophia Regiment was completely engulfed by French cavalry but fought its way clear.

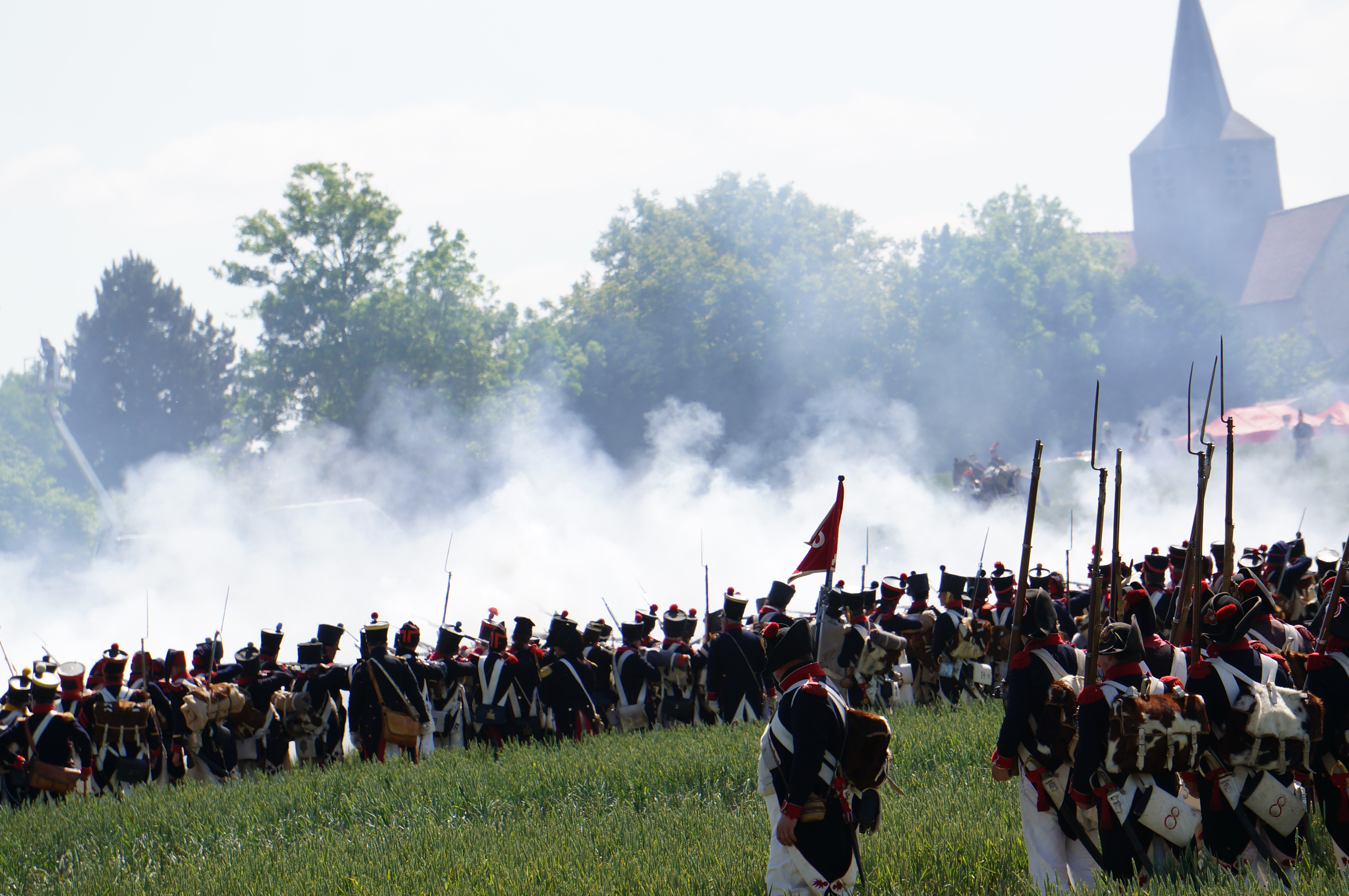
Ricard's division goes into action near Marchais during a re-enactment of the battle.

Pirch attacked with the 1st East Prussian and West Prussian Grenadier Battalions and the 5th Silesian Landwehr Regiment in the first line screened by a cloud of skirmishers. The second line consisted of the Leib and Silesian Grenadier Battalions and the 13th Landwehr Regiment. Mortier put four Old Guard battalions into the Bailly woods alongside Ricard's 2/2nd Light and 7/4th Light Infantry Battalions. Despite the support from Russian artillery, the Prussian attack recoiled amid blistering musketry and canister shot. When French skirmishers threatened to envelop one flank, the 2/5th Silesian Landwehr charged with the bayonet to cut its way out. Ignoring the protests of his staff, Yorck went up to encourage the skirmish line, saying, "I want to die if you cannot stop the enemy."

After Michel counterattacked the Prussians with ten battalions, the Leib Grenadier Battalion and the 1/5th Silesian Landwehr met them. Two battalions of the Leib Infantry Regiment anchored the Prussian right flank while the 1st Brigade re-formed on their left. Pirch led a bayonet attack that temporarily stopped the French, but he was badly wounded. He was replaced in command by Colonel Losthin. As Prussian retreat continued, the 13th Silesian Landwehr and the Silesian Grenadier Battalion were assailed in the woods, but managed to drive off their French pursuers. The Prussians ended the day between Fontenelle and Viffort.

By evening the Polish Lancers of the Guard fought their way as far west as Viels-Maisons. Sacken was nearly trapped, but Yorck's effort gave the Russians enough time and space to get away. With Vasilshikov's cavalry covering the withdrawal, the Russians headed for the Château-Thierry road as it rained. The Russian retreat through marshes and woods was guided by a line of bonfires. The artillery was saved by detailing 50 cavalrymen to help pull each gun using ropes, though eight disabled pieces were abandoned. After an all-night march, Sacken's troops reached Viffort on the main road and continued marching northward toward Château-Thierry.

== Results ==
According to Petre, the French sustained 2,000 casualties while inflicting losses of 2,000 killed and wounded on the Russians while capturing 800 soldiers, six colors and 13 guns. The Prussians suffered an additional 900 casualties. Chandler asserted that the French lost 2,000 men while the Allies lost 4,000. Nafziger noted that the 1st Prussian Brigade lost 877 officers and men while the 7th Brigade's casualties are unknown. He cited various sources that gave Allied losses ranging from a low of 1,500 Russians, 877 Prussians and nine guns to a high of 3,000 killed and wounded plus 708 prisoners, 26 guns and 200 wagons. French losses are consistently reported at 2,000 men with Generals Nansouty, Michel and Boudin de Roville wounded.

MacDonald at Meaux was unable to carry out his orders to advance because he had destroyed the Trilport bridge. His subordinate Horace François Bastien Sébastiani de La Porta was unable to move because Sacken had broken the La Ferté-sous-Jouarre bridge. MacDonald sent his cavalry under Antoine Louis Decrest de Saint-Germain to join Napoleon via Coulommiers. Napoleon again ordered MacDonald to seize Château-Thierry, so that the Allied retreat would be blocked. He was taking a gamble. Napoleon intended to pursue Sacken and Yorck with maximum forces, hoping to trap them against the Marne. He also needed to consider that Blücher was positioned to the east with 20,000 men and 80 guns. Though the emperor began getting calls for help from Victor, he calculated that the unaggressive Schwarzenberg would move slowly while he dealt with Blücher's army. The Battle of Château-Thierry would be fought on 12 February.

== Souvenirs of King Louis-Philippe ==
Louis-Philippe, then Duke of Orléans, had fought with the armies of the French Republic at Jemappes and Valmy in 1792. Returning from exile after Napoleon's fall, he commissioned Horace Vernet to paint four large battle scenes depicting French victories during the Revolutionary and Napoleonic Wars. These paintings, celebrating French military glory as well as the king's own, were hung at the Palais-Royal. Completed over five years, they depict the Battle of Jemappes (1821), the Battle of Montmirail (1822), the Battle of Hanau (1824) and the Battle of Valmy (1826). Damaged by fire during the 1848 revolution, they were restored by Vernet himself. They are now held at the National Gallery in London.

== Tribute ==
One of the tanks of the 501e Régiment de chars de combat (501st Combat Tank Regiment in English), part of General Leclerc's 2nd Armored Division, was named MONTMIRAIL. On the evening of 24 August, accompanying Captain Dronne's detachment, it was among the first to enter Paris, leading a section that also included the tanks ROMILLY and CHAMPAUBERT.

== Today ==
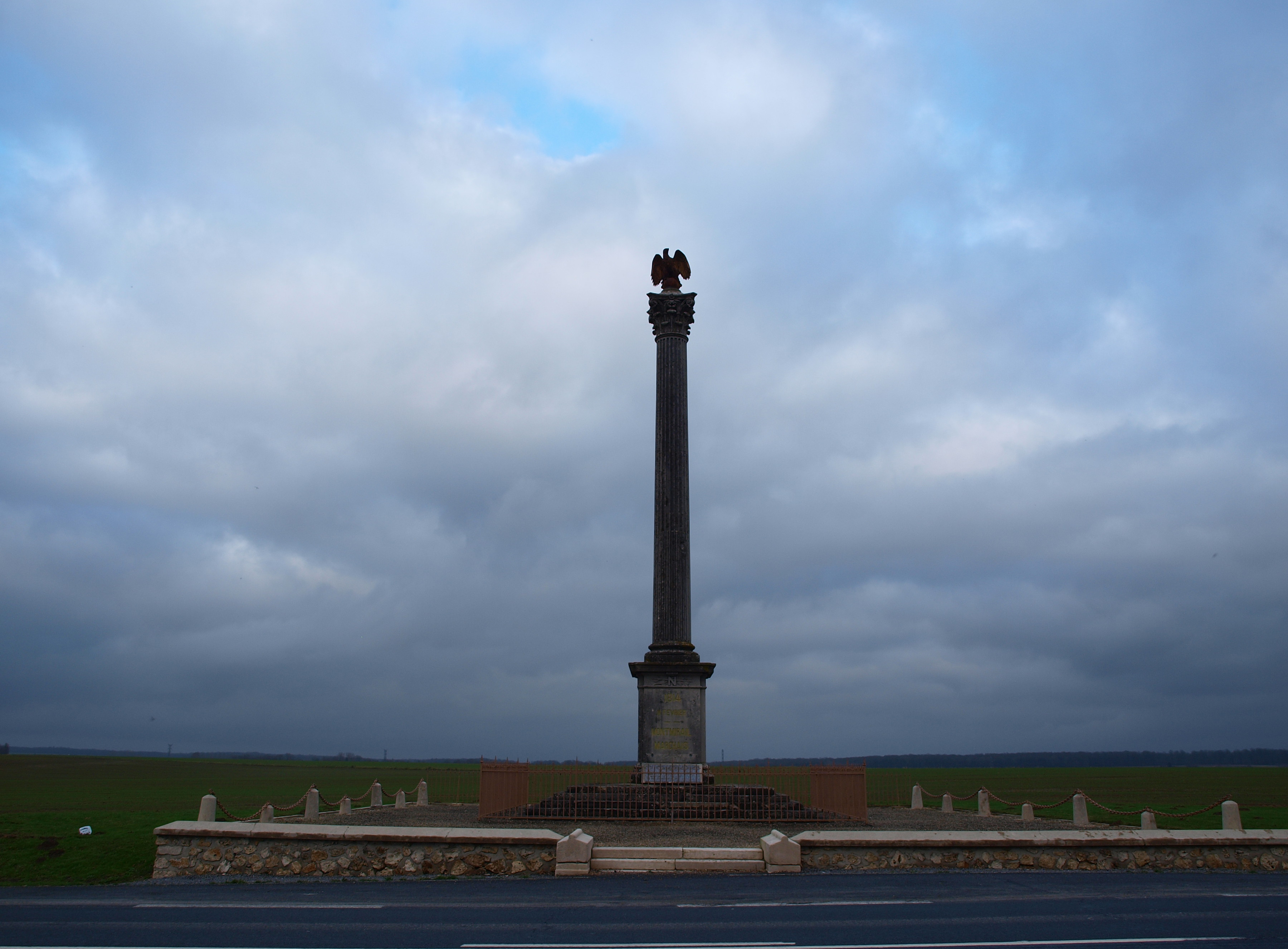
View of the column.

A column-shaped monument, the Montmirail Memorial Column, commemorating this battle as well as the other French victories of February 1814, stands beside the Paris road. There is also an orientation table in Marchais-en-Brie, and a bicentenary commemoration of the battle was held there.

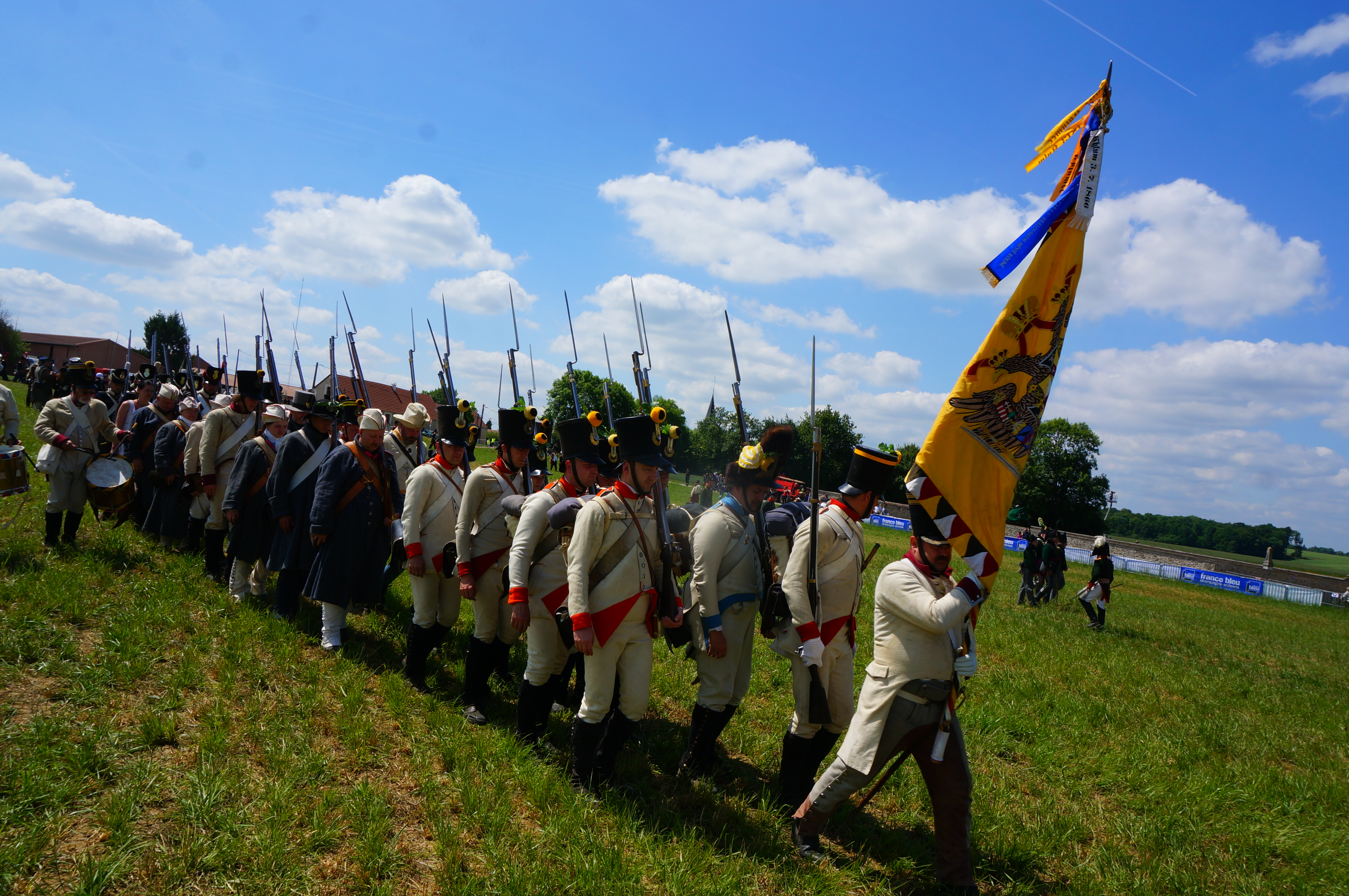
Coalition infantry.

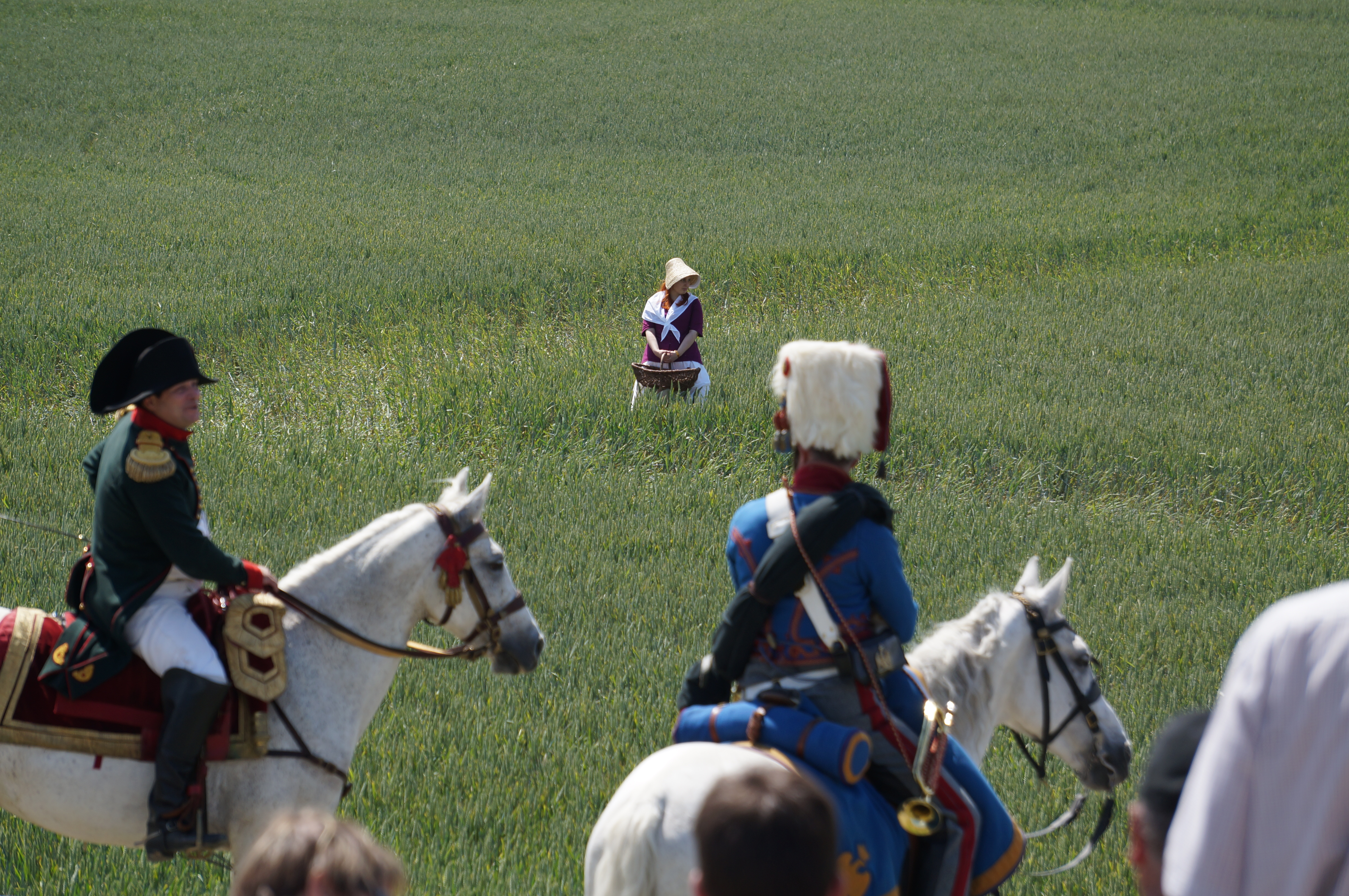
Emperor Napoleon on the battlefield.

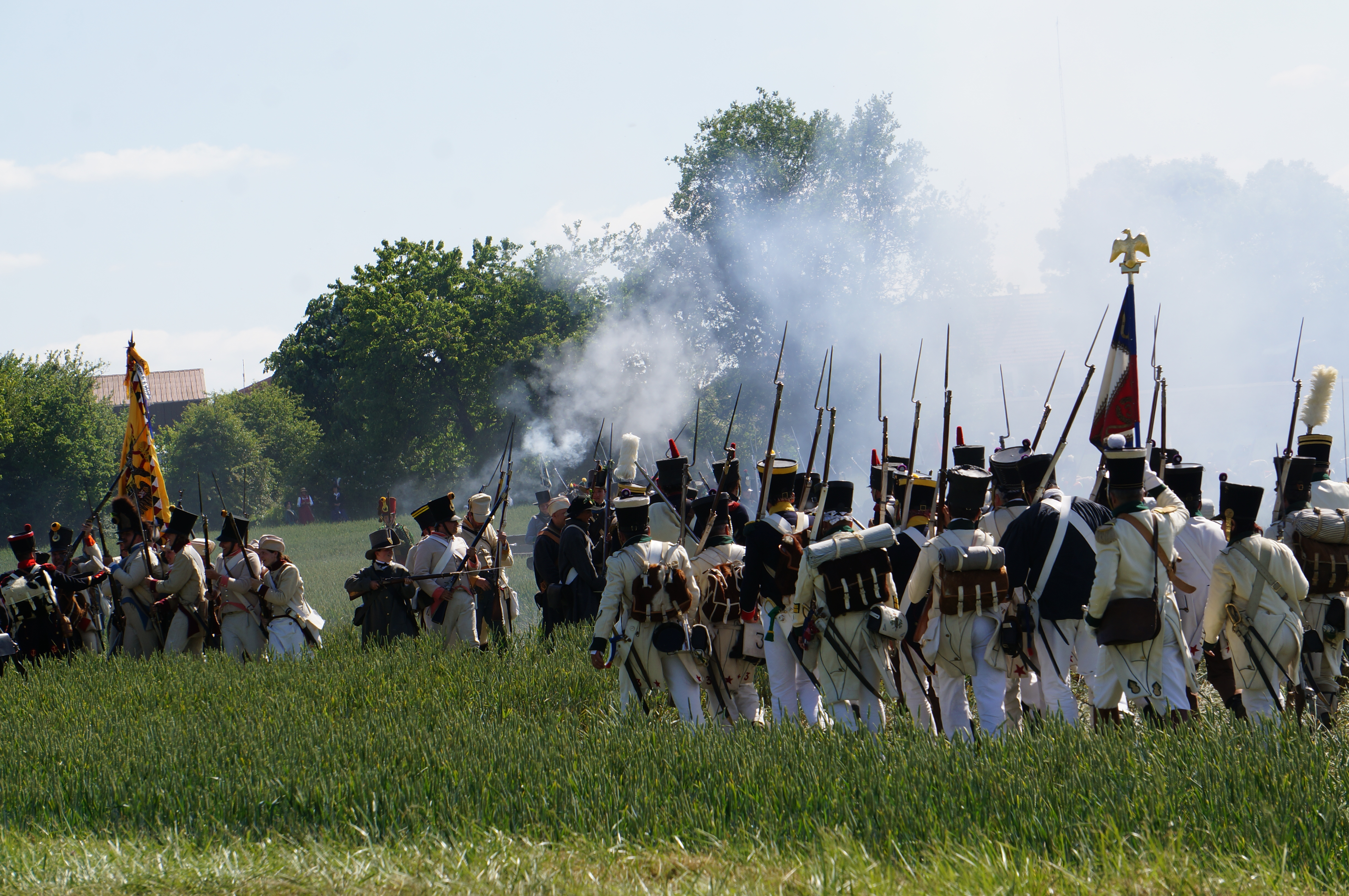
Coalition cavalry charge on the French guns.

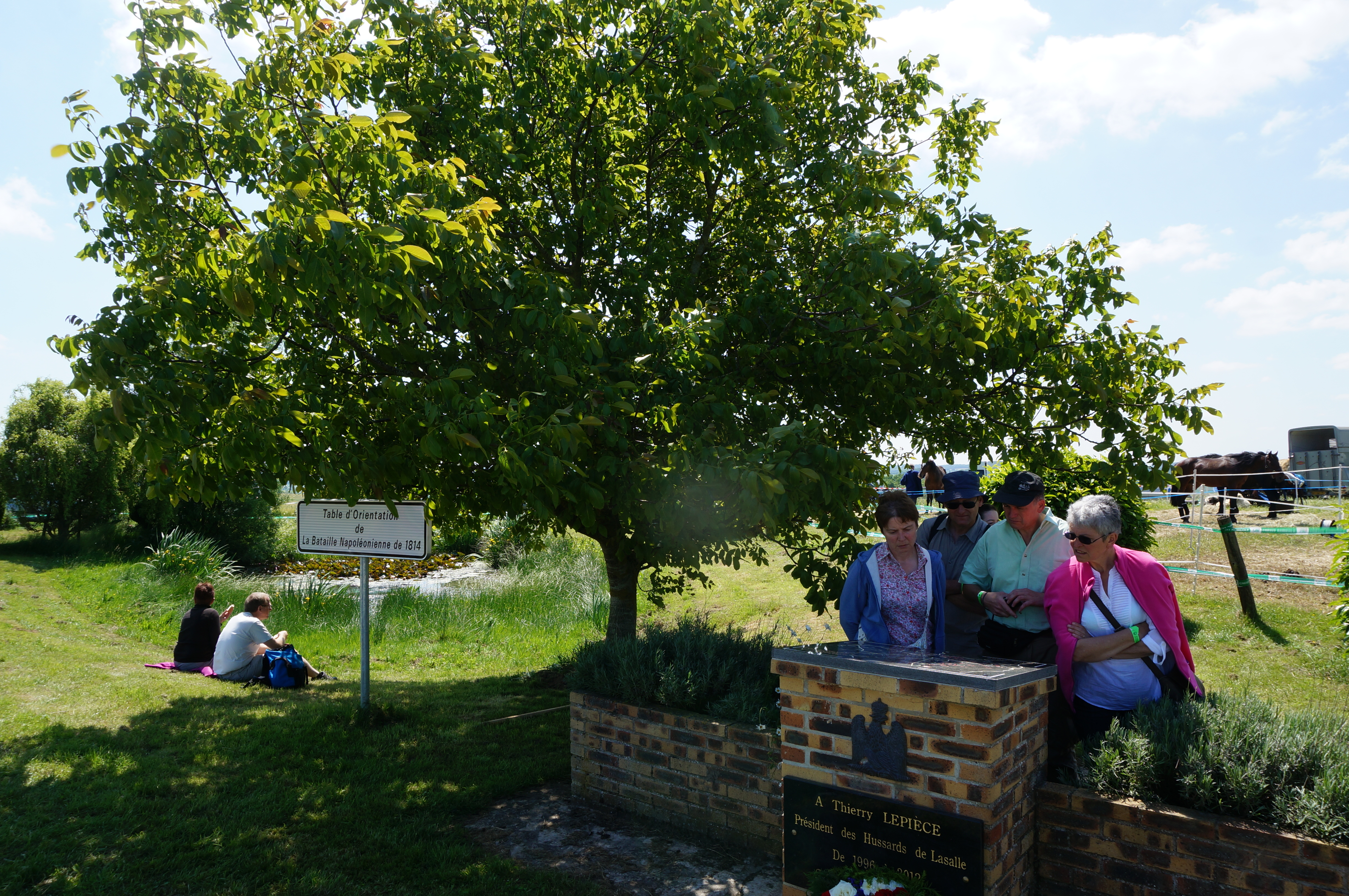
Orientation table for the Six Days' Campaign.

== Notes ==
Preceded by Battle of Champaubert	Napoleonic Wars; Battle of Montmirail	Succeeded by Battle of Château-Thierry (1814)
