= Battle of Château-Thierry (1814) =

1814 battle during the War of the Sixth Coalition

- Part of the Six Days' Campaign within the Campaign of France of the Sixth Coalition
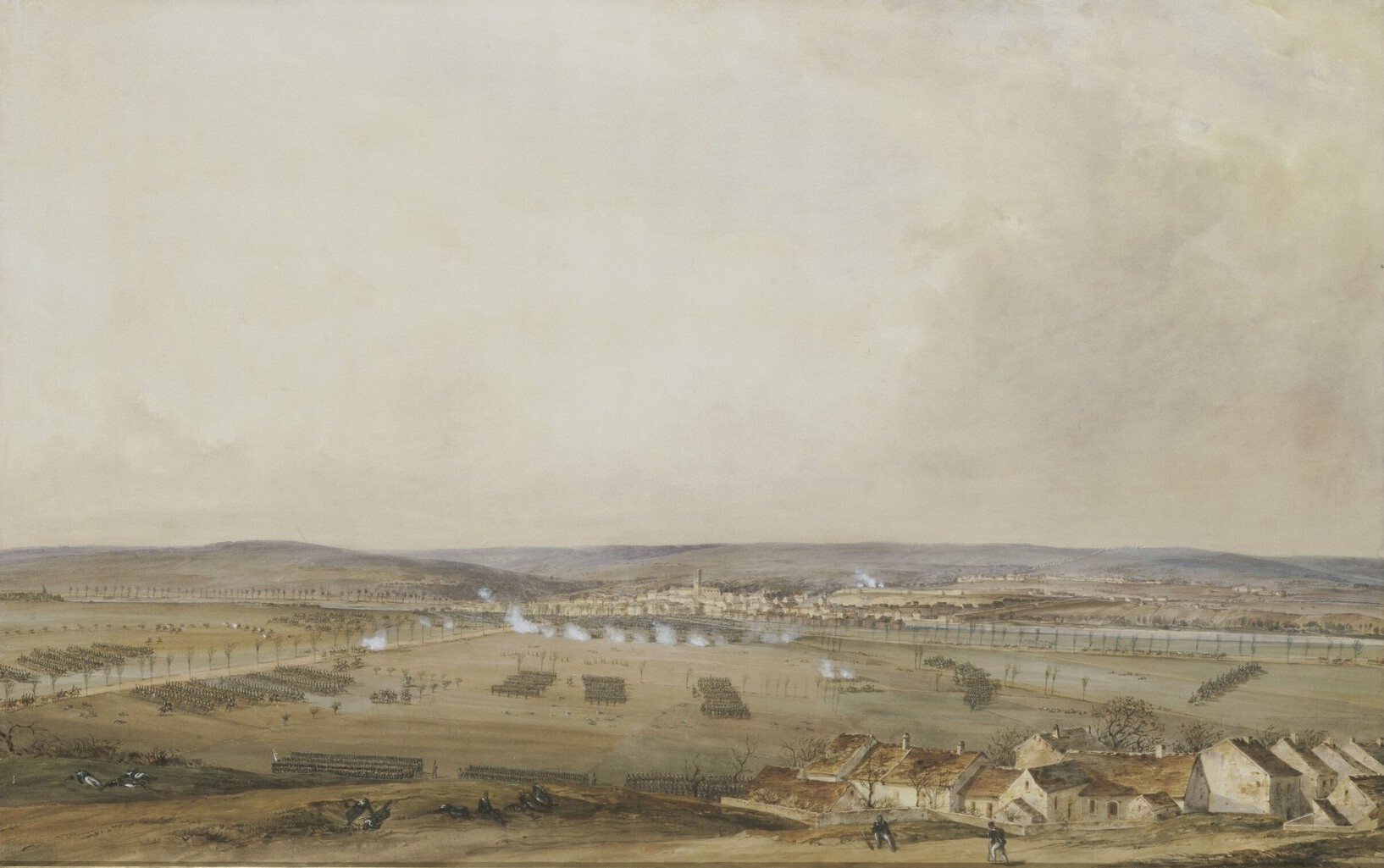
- Battle of Château-Thierry by Siméon Fort, 1842–1843
Date	12 February 1814
Location	Château-Thierry, French Empire 49.0400°N 3.4000°E
Result	French victory

Belligerents
(First French Empire) France	(Kingdom of Prussia) Prussia (Russian Empire) Russia

Commanders and leaders
(First French Empire) Napoleon Bonaparte	(Kingdom of Prussia) Ludwig Yorck (Russian Empire) Fabian von Osten-Sacken

Strength
20,000	Prussia: 17,000; Russia: 17,000; Total: 30,000–34,000

Casualties and losses
400–600 killed, wounded, or captured	Prussia: 1,251 killed, wounded, or captured 6 guns lost Russia: 1,500 killed, wounded, or captured 3 guns lost Total casualties: 2,751–3,000 killed, wounded or captured 9 guns lost
- Location within France

War of the Sixth Coalition:
Campaign in north-east France
current battle
Napoleon in command
Napoleon not in command

The Battle of Château-Thierry (12 February 1814) saw the Imperial French army commanded by Emperor Napoleon attempt to destroy a Prussian corps led by Ludwig Yorck von Wartenburg and an Imperial Russian corps under Fabian Wilhelm von Osten-Sacken. The two Allied corps managed to escape across the Marne River, but suffered considerably heavier losses than the pursuing French. This action occurred during the Six Days' Campaign, a series of victories that Napoleon won over Prussian Field Marshal Gebhard Leberecht von Blücher's Army of Silesia. Château-Thierry lies about 75 kilometres (47 mi) northeast of Paris.

After defeating Napoleon in the Battle of La Rothière, Blücher's army separated from the main Allied army of Austrian field marshal Karl Philipp, Prince of Schwarzenberg. Blücher's troops marched northwest and followed the Marne valley in a thrust toward Paris while Schwarzenberg's army moved west through Troyes. Leaving part of his badly outnumbered army to watch Schwarzenberg's slow advance, Napoleon moved north against Blücher. Catching the Silesian Army badly strung out, Napoleon demolished Zakhar Dmitrievich Olsufiev's Russian corps in the Battle of Champaubert on 10 February. Turning west, the French emperor defeated Sacken and Yorck in the hard-fought Battle of Montmirail on the following day. As the Allies scrambled north toward Château-Thierry's bridge across the Marne, Napoleon launched his army in hot pursuit but failed to annihilate Yorck and Sacken. Napoleon soon found that Blücher was advancing to attack him with two more corps and the Battle of Vauchamps was fought on 14 February.

== Prelude ==
The Allies were jubilant after beating Napoleon in the Battle of La Rothière on 1 February 1814. In particular, Blücher and his generals believed that the war would soon be over. Pleading the difficulty of supplying the combined armies along a single line of communication, Schwarzenberg agreed to allow Blücher's army to operate along a more northerly route. Schwarzenberg's Army of Bohemia would march west through Troyes along the Seine River, while Blücher would move north to Châlons-sur-Marne and then drive west along the Marne valley toward Meaux. The Russian corps of Peter Wittgenstein and a Cossack scouting force under Alexander Nikitich Seslavin would provide the link between the two armies. One historian estimated that the two Allied armies numbered 200,000 between them, against 70,000 French.

The Allies totally lost contact with Napoleon's retreating army. Already on 4 February, Schwarzenberg started to become anxious about his left flank and began pulling Wittgenstein's corps to the south, away from Blücher. On 5 February, Russian General Michael Andreas Barclay de Tolly ordered Seslavin's force away to the extreme left flank without notifying Blücher. Over the next few days, the Prussian field marshal mistakenly continued to believe that Seslavin watched the gap on his left flank. At this time, Napoleon began to consider the possibility of moving against Blücher's army. The French emperor calculated that Marshals Claude Perrin Victor and Nicolas Oudinot with 39,000 troops would be able to hold off the cautious Schwarzenberg. Meanwhile, Napoleon gathered a strike force of 20,000 infantry and 10,000 cavalry and prepared to march against Blücher.

By 8 February, Blücher's advancing Army of Silesia spread itself out across 44 miles (71 km). Farthest to the west was Sacken's cavalry at Viels-Maisons while his infantry was at Montmirail. The Russian was in pursuit of Marshal Jacques MacDonald's 10,000-man French corps. Also following MacDonald was Yorck's corps which reached Dormans to the northeast of Montmirail. Olsufiev's 4,000-man corps was 12 miles (19 km) east of Sacken at Étoges. Peter Mikhailovich Kaptzevich's Russian corps and Friedrich von Kleist's Prussian corps were 25 miles (40 km) farther east at Châlons-sur-Marne. On 9 February, with everyone marching west, Kaptzevich and Kleist reached Bergères-lès-Vertus, Olsufiev arrived at Champaubert, Sacken got to La Ferté-sous-Jouarre, and Yorck approached Château-Thierry. Prussian staff officer Karl Freiherr von Muffling wrote that Sacken had 20,000 soldiers and Yorck's corps numbered 18,000 men while Olsufiev, Kaptzevich and Kleist together counted 19,000 troops. Another source gave Sacken strength as 16,000.

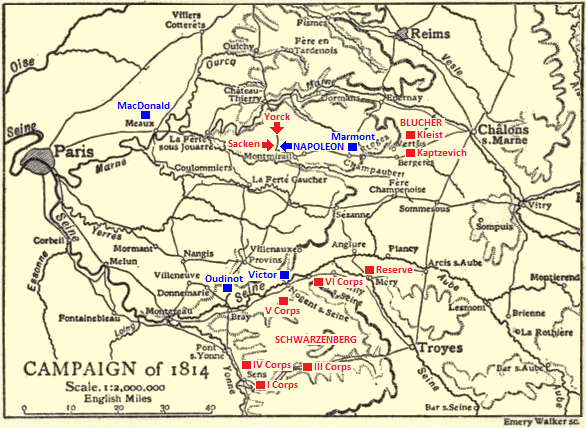
Napoleon battles Sacken and Yorck near Montmirail on 11 February 1814.

On 9 February, Napoleon arrived at Sézanne with the Imperial Guard after a difficult march over muddy roads. French farmers brought their teams of horses to help pull the cannons through the quagmire. That day, Schwarzenberg asked Blücher to reinforce his right wing. Dutifully, the Prussian commander set out on 10 February with Kaptzevich and Kleist, moving southwest toward Sézanne. As the Allies marched, they heard the distant growl of cannons to their right. It was Napoleon's army falling on Olsufiev's outnumbered corps in the Battle of Champaubert. After an obstinate resistance, Olsufiev tried to break out to the east, but he was captured and his corps effectively destroyed. During the fighting, Olsufiev sent several messengers stating that he was under attack, but Blücher ignored them. The 1,500 Russian survivors of the debacle were organized into 3–4 combined battalions. This hard-luck outfit would suffer 600 casualties and lose all its remaining cannons at the Battle of Vauchamps on 14 February.

On 11 February, Napoleon turned the bulk of his army west toward Montmirail. He hoped to catch and destroy Sacken's corps between his army on the east and MacDonald's corps to the west at Meaux. Sacken's soldiers made a night march east toward Montmirail. Though Yorck urged his ally to retreat toward Château-Thierry, Sacken remained unaware of his danger and determined to fight what he believed was a weak enemy force. In the event, MacDonald had broken the Trilport bridge over the Marne, preventing him from striking Sacken's corps from the west. Delayed by the muddy roads, Yorck's tired troops were approaching Montmirail from the north, but still out of touch with Sacken. Napoleon barely managed to interpose some French soldiers at an important road intersection between the two Allied corps.

In the Battle of Montmirail, Napoleon with 10,500 men and 36 guns faced Sacken's 18,000 Russians at 11:00 am while the vanguard of Yorck's 18,000 Prussians appeared to the north. By 4:00 pm reinforcements raised the French total to 20,000 and Napoleon went over to the attack. Another historian credited Napoleon with 27,153 troops at Montmirail, while the Prussians believed that 24,000 French soldiers were present. During the early afternoon, the two armies engaged a bitter struggle over the village of Marchais-en-Brie south of the Montmirail-Meaux highway while Napoleon tried to break through Sacken's left wing near the highway. Meanwhile, Yorck's troops attacked from the north at 3:30 pm, only to be repulsed. Finally, the French infantry flushed Sacken's men out of Marchais into the open where they were ridden down by French cavalry. Yorck's belated intervention probably saved Sacken's corps, which retreated to the north that evening. Sacken's corps suffered 2,000 killed and wounded, plus 800 soldiers, 13 field guns, and six colors captured. Yorck sustained 900 casualties and French losses were around 2,000 men.

== Battle ==
=== Action ===
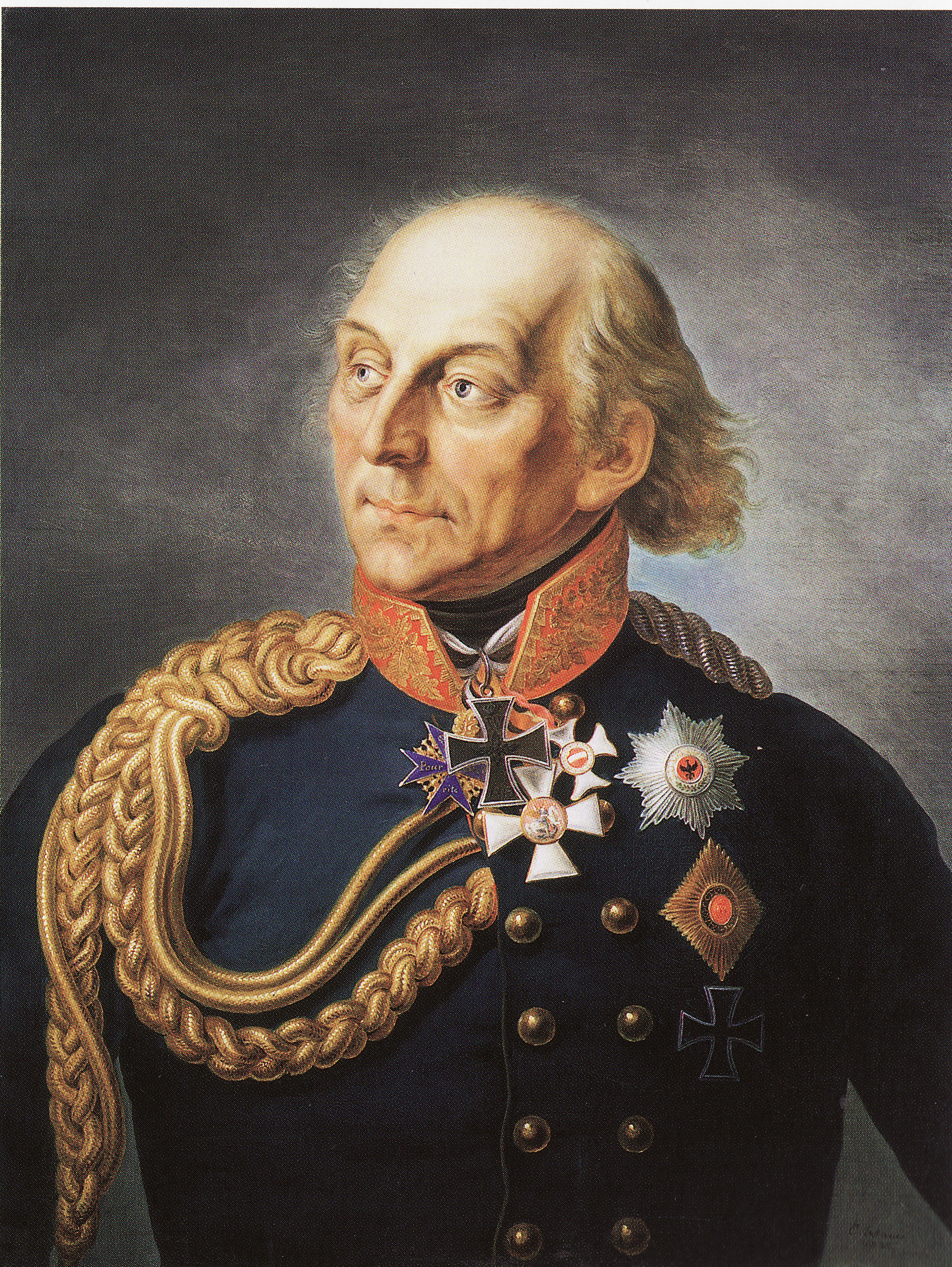
Ludwig Yorck

On 11 February, Kaptzevich and Kleist turned around and marched back to Bergères. Blücher authorized Yorck and Sacken to withdraw via Château-Thierry toward Reims where his army would reassemble. MacDonald sent Antoine-Louis Decrest de Saint-Germain with part of his cavalry across the Marne to Coulommiers by a roundabout route. The remainder of his cavalry under Horace Sebastiani was unable to cross at La Ferté-sous-Jouarre because Sacken had broken its bridge. Napoleon launched his troops after the beaten Allies at 9:00 am on 12 February. Marshal Édouard Mortier commanded the pursuit on the main highway while Napoleon personally led another column farther west through Rozoy. The French emperor ordered MacDonald to seize the bridge at Château-Thierry.

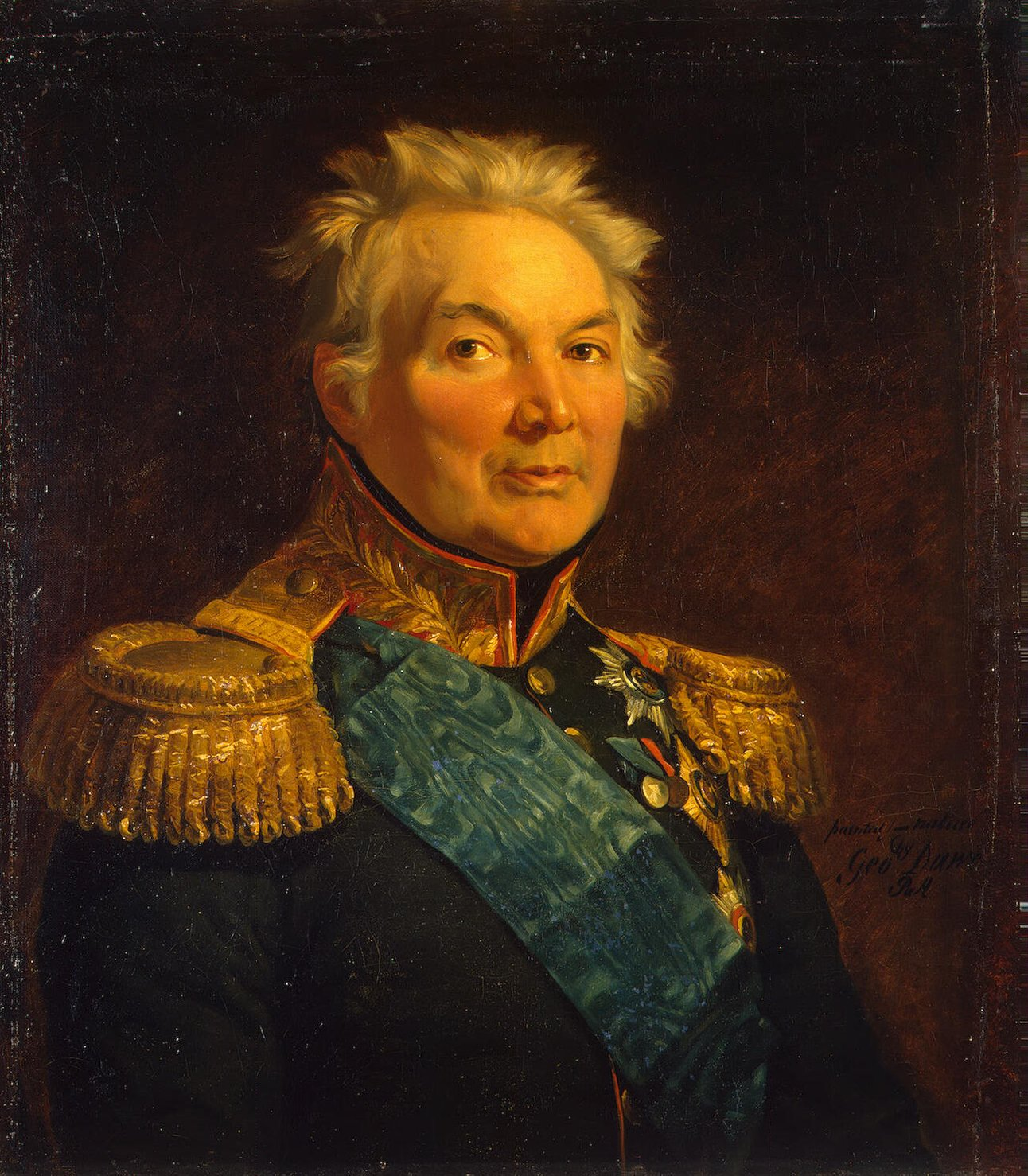
Fabian von Osten-Sacken

At dawn on 12 February, Sacken's corps passed through Yorck's lines near Montfaucon. Sacken dropped off a brigade under General Heidenreich that consisted of the Tambov and Kostroma Regiments. Friedrich von Katzler's advance guard stood at Montfaucon with the 1st and 7th Prussian Brigades and the Reserve cavalry of Georg Ludwig von Wahlen-Jürgass in support. Mortier marched to Fontenelle-en-Brie with the 2nd Old Guard Division under Charles-Joseph Christiani, the 1st Voltiguer Division under Claude Marie Meunier, and the Gardes d'Honneur cavalry. Napoleon had Saint-Germain with 2,400 cavalry and Louis Friant's 1st Old Guard Division. At 1:00 pm, Mortier's advance encountered Katzler's Prussians near Viffort and the Caquerets Hills. Katzler's 1st and 2nd East Prussia Infantry Regiments overlooked a stream. The position was attacked by two battalions of Old Guard Foot Chasseurs and Napoleon's duty squadrons led by Claude-Étienne Guyot. Katzler withdrew when the French began turning his flanks.

Farther along the highway, the French found Heinrich Wilhelm von Horn's 7th Brigade barring their advance. The 2nd Silesian and Leib Grenadier Battalions defended the right flank while the Leib Regiment held the left flank. While the French forces began to deploy in front, a large force of cavalry under Marshal Michel Ney began to maneuver around the Prussian left flank. These were four divisions of elite cavalry under Pierre David de Colbert-Chabanais, Jean-Marie Defrance, Charles Lefebvre-Desnouettes, and Louis Marie Levesque de Laferrière. At this time, Napoleon sent 200 grenadiers to seize the hamlet of Petite-Noue. Mortier launched six battalions under Christiani in a frontal attack. Aware that he would have to fight with a river at his back, Yorck ordered his wagon train to cross to the north bank of the Marne.

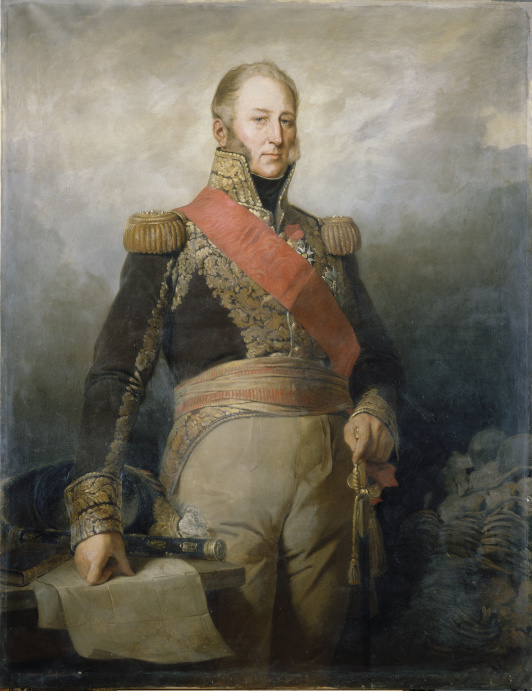
Édouard Mortier

Yorck ordered Jürgass to move 3,000 Reserve cavalry from the highway to the left flank to counter the French cavalry threat. They were joined by the Brandenberg Hussar Regiment under Friedrich von Sohr. Many of the Prussian cavalrymen were Landwehr - second class soldiers. Jürgass formed his horsemen in two ranks, with the Lithuanian and 1st West Prussian Dragoon Regiments in the first line. There was also a Russian dragoon regiment on hand. Defrance and Laferrière placed the Guard Dragoons in the first line and the Horse Grenadiers, cuirassiers, and horse carabiniers in the second line. As the Prussian front line charged, it was met with a volley of carbine fire from the dragoons. At the same time, the Brandenburg Dragoons charged the 10th Hussars and French dragoons routed the Russian dragoons. Soon there was a large cavalry melee near the Petite-Baloy farm.

The French cavalry prevailed, driving the Prussian first line back into its second line, and causing both to retreat in confusion. The French cavalry seized two cannons and a howitzer. Yorck ordered the 1st and 7th Brigades to retreat, which they did in good order. The 15th Silesian Landwehr Regiment shifted to La Trinit farm on the left flank. Many of its soldiers became the victims of French cavalry later in the day. There was also a Russian jäger battalion near La Trinit farm. Forming the rear guard, the Leib Regiment was cut off by a French dragoon regiment, but it made a bayonet charge and broke free. Two battalions of Old Guard Foot Grenadiers and the duty squadrons pressed back the Prussian right flank under Prince William almost to Château-Thierry. Covering the Allied right flank, Heidenreich formed his two regiments into square and tried to retreat. After his troops fired away all their ammunition, they were overrun. Heidenreich and most of his brigade were captured, along with three cannons.

A force of French cavalry under Louis-Michel Letort de Lorville circled around Nogentel. As the retreating Prussian column emerged from the village Letort's horsemen charged into the Silesian and Leib Grenadier Battalions and the 5th Silesian Regiment, inflicting numerous casualties and capturing two cannons and a howitzer from 6-pounder Battery Nr. 2. As the Prussian columns withdrew within the streets of Château-Thierry, the 2nd Battalions of the 1st and 2nd East Prussian Regiments under Major Stockhausen formed the rear guard. The Leib Fusilier Battalion under Major Holleben guarded the pontoon bridge. Stockhausen's action allowed other units to escape across the bridge, but by the time his 400 soldiers fought their way to the bridge, it had been destroyed. His 400 survivors were compelled to surrender. A Prussian 12-pounder battery firing from the north bank of the Marne prevented pursuit.

== Result ==
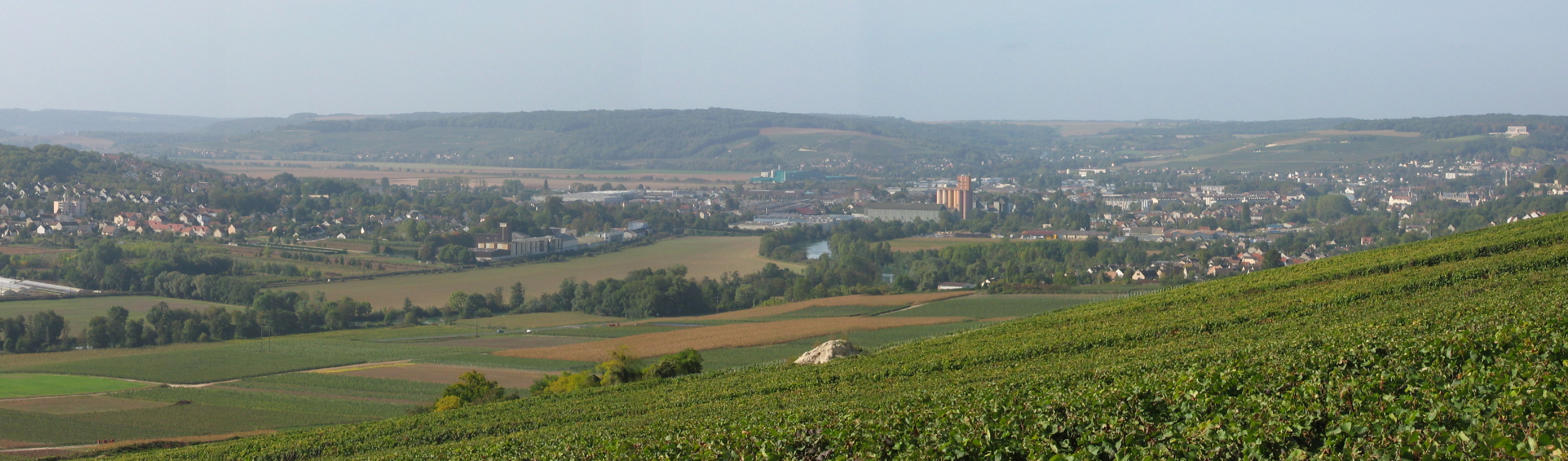
Château-Thierry countryside.

Historians David G. Chandler and Francis Loraine Petre stated that the Prussians had 1,250 casualties, the Russians 1,500, and the French 600. The French also captured nine cannons and much baggage and transport. Other authorities put French losses at 400–600, Prussian killed and wounded at 22 officers and 1,229 enlisted men, and Russian losses at 1,200–1,500 soldiers. That evening, the two Allied corps retreated north to Oulchy-la-Ville. Since the French army lacked a bridging train, it took a full day before the Château-Thierry bridge could be rebuilt. When it was finished, Mortier led the divisions of Christiani, Colbert, and Defrance in pursuit of the Allies. They rounded up 300–400 stragglers and found a number of artillery caissons destroyed by the Allies in their hasty retreat.

Napoleon wrote, "My Foot and Horse Guard covered themselves with glory … The enemy seemed struck by a singular terror". However, the emperor was extremely disappointed that he had failed to destroy Sacken and Yorck. MacDonald hardly budged and failed to capture the all-important Château-Thierry bridge. The next day, Yorck's troops marched to Fismes while Sacken moved to Reims. Prince William's brigade observed Soissons. On 12 February, Blücher waited at Vertus for news from Yorck and Sacken. Since 11 February, Marshal Auguste de Marmont with one infantry division and the I Cavalry Corps watched Blücher. The Prussian field marshal finally decided that Napoleon was retreating. On 13 February, Blücher began pushing west with Kaptzevich and Kleist, enforcing the Battle of Vauchamps.

== Notes ==
Preceded by Battle of Montmirail	Napoleonic Wars; Battle of Château-Thierry (1814)	Succeeded by Battle of Vauchamps
