= Battle of Château-Thierry =

There have been two Battles of Château-Thierry fought near the French town of Château-Thierry on the Marne River:

- Battle of Château-Thierry (1814), 12 February 1814, Napoleon defeats Blücher
- Battle of Château-Thierry (1918), 18 July 1918, French and American attack during the Second Battle of the Marne
