= 02458 =

02458 may refer to:

- Newton, Massachusetts, U.S., a city, particularly the villages of:
  - Nonantum, Massachusetts
  - Newton Corner, Massachusetts
- Dhuys-et-Morin-en-Brie, a commune in Aisne department, France
