= Artonges =

- Part of Dhuys-et-Morin-en-Brie
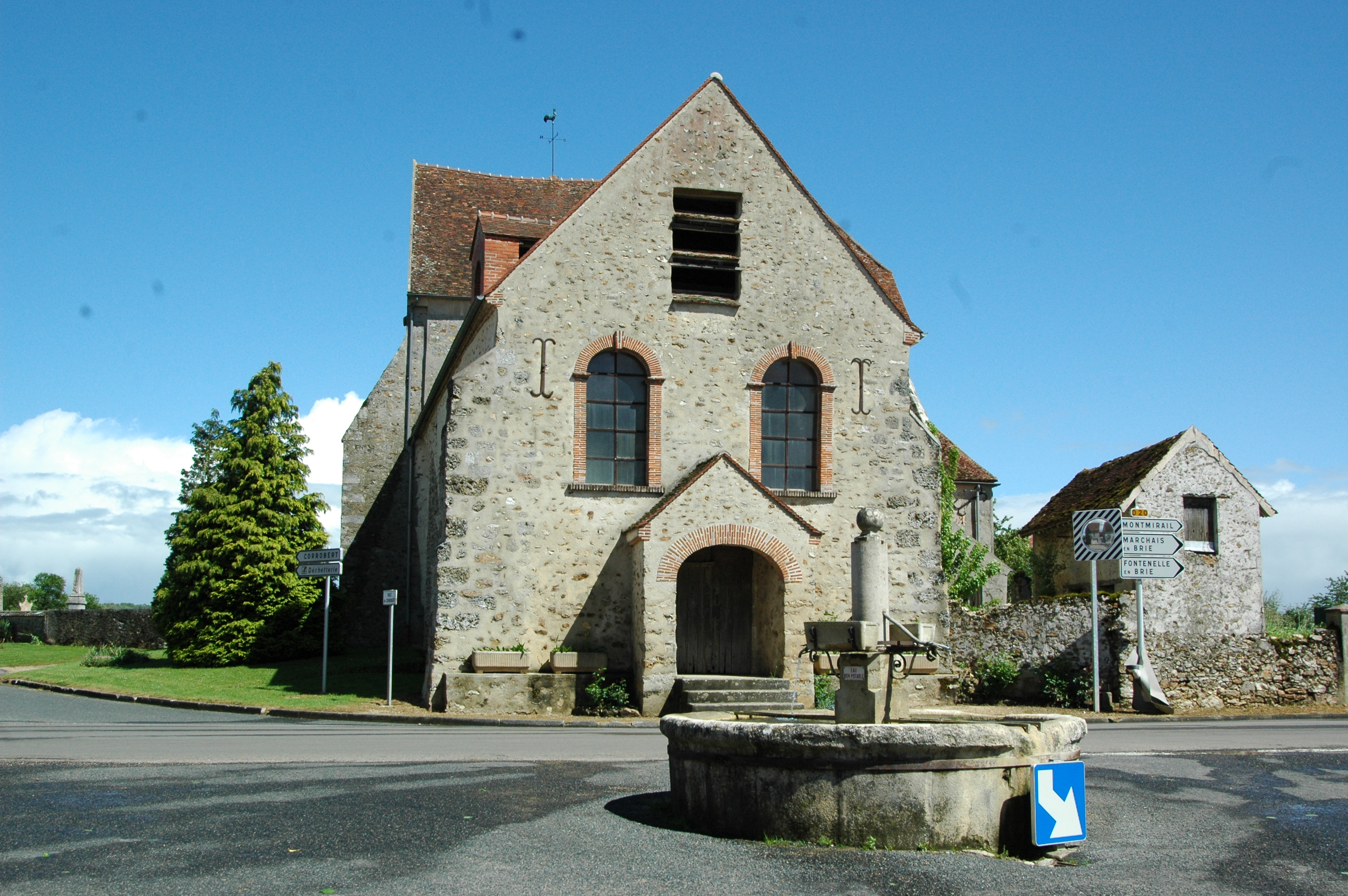
- Location of Artonges
- Location within France Location within Hauts-de-France
- Coordinates: 48°55′48″N 3°33′13″E
- Country: France
- Region: Hauts-de-France
- Department: Aisne
- Arrondissement: Château-Thierry
- Canton: Essômes-sur-Marne
- Commune: Dhuys-et-Morin-en-Brie
- Area^{1}: 13.12 km^{2} (5.07 sq mi)
- Elevation: 165 m (541 ft)
- Highest elevation: 211 m (692 ft)
- Lowest elevation: 140 m (460 ft)
- Population (2021): 172
  - Density: 13.1/km^{2} (34.0/sq mi)
- Time zone: UTC+01:00 (CET)
  - Summer (DST): UTC+02:00 (CEST)
- Postal code: 02330
- ^{1} French Land Register data, which excludes lakes, ponds, glaciers > 1 km^{2} (0.386 sq mi or 247 acres) and river estuaries.

Artonges (French pronunciation: [aʁtɔ̃ʒ]) is a former commune in the department of Aisne in northern France. On 1 January 2016, it was merged into the new commune Dhuys-et-Morin-en-Brie.

== Geography ==
Artonge is a commune in the south of the department of Aisne in the old Brie Champagne region, located on a high plateau not far from the sources of the Dhuys and the edge of the forest of "Rouges Fossés" (Red Ditches).

It is located some 20 km south-east of Château-Thierry and 35 km south-west of Épernay. It can be accessed by the D20 road from Pargny-la-Dhuys in the north coming south through the village and continuing south-west to Marchais-en-Brie. The D201 branches south off the D20 changing to the D40 at the border of the commune and continuing south to Montmirail. There is also the D866 coming from Nesles-la-Montagne in the north-west terminating in the village. There is also a railway line coming from the north with Artongeole Station just north of the village. The railway continues south-west through Montmirail. The commune is mixed farmland and forest.

The Ru des Rieux flows through the village from its source to the west and flows south-west into the Ravine de la Dhuys.

== History ==
The name Hertungiae was mentioned in 1137.

== Administration ==
List of Mayors of Artonges

From	To	Name
2001	2008	François Girard
2008	2016	Gislaine Dadou

== Demography ==
The inhabitants of the commune are known as Artongeois or Artongeoises in French.

Historical population

Year	Pop.	±% p.a.
1793	245	—
1821	267	+0.31%
1846	281	+0.20%
1872	311	+0.39%
1901	277	−0.40%
1926	229	−0.76%
1946	199	−0.70%
1962	229	+0.88%

Year	Pop.	±% p.a.
1968	235	+0.43%
1975	159	−5.43%
1982	142	−1.60%
1990	134	−0.72%
1999	145	+0.88%
2007	161	+1.32%
2012	194	+3.80%
2021	172	−1.33%

Source: EHESS and INSEE

== Sites and Monuments ==
- The Choir and the Transept of the Church of Saint Peter (15th century) are registered as an historical monument. The earliest parts date back to the 15th century but it has been rebuilt over the centuries. This church has no proper tower but rather a bell housed in a Dormer of the north side of the roof over the nave. The church has been the subject of a complete restoration and was returned to the Church during a Mass celebrated by Friar Gandon, the parish priest of Our Lady of the Three Valleys on which it depends, and Bishop Giraud, Bishop of Soissons in 2009. The Churtch contains a Stained glass window: Christ on the Cross (16th century) which is registered as an historical object.
- The Fountain is powered by a reliable source of water which was once thought to cure sore throats and fevers.
- The Lavoir (Public laundry) is decorated on the theme of a fable by Jean de La Fontaine: "The fox, the flies, and the hedgehog".
- The Chateau is a former lordship which was vassal to Montmirail and is privately owned.

== See also ==
- Communes of the Aisne department

=== External links ===
- Artonges on the old National Geographic Institute website (in French)
- Artonges on the Canton of Condé-en-Brie official website (in French)
- Bell Towers website (in French)
- Artonges on Géoportail, National Geographic Institute (IGN) website (in French)
- Artonges on the 1750 Cassini Map
