= La Celle =

La Celle is the name or part of the name of nineteen communes of France:

- La Celle, Allier, in the Allier département
- La Celle, Cher, in the Cher département
- La Celle, Puy-de-Dôme, in the Puy-de-Dôme département
- La Celle, Var, in the Var département
- La Celle-Condé, in the Cher département
- La Celle-Dunoise, in the Creuse département
- La Celle-en-Morvan, in the Saône-et-Loire département
- La Celle-Guenand, in the Indre-et-Loire département
- La Celle-les-Bordes, in the Yvelines département
- La Celle-Saint-Avant, in the Indre-et-Loire département
- La Celle-Saint-Cloud, in the Yvelines département
- La Celle-Saint-Cyr, in the Yonne département
- La Celle-sous-Chantemerle, in the Marne département
- La Celle-sous-Gouzon, in the Creuse département
- La Celle-sous-Montmirail, in the Aisne département
- La Celle-sur-Loire, in the Nièvre département
- La Celle-sur-Morin, in the Seine-et-Marne département
- La Celle-sur-Nièvre, in the Nièvre département
- Vernou-la-Celle-sur-Seine, in the Seine-et-Marne département
