= La Celle-sous-Montmirail =

- Part of Dhuys-et-Morin-en-Brie
- Location of La Celle-sous-Montmirail
- Location within France Location within Hauts-de-France
- Coordinates: 48°51′56″N 3°28′01″E
- Country: France
- Region: Hauts-de-France
- Department: Aisne
- Arrondissement: Château-Thierry
- Canton: Condé-en-Brie
- Commune: Dhuys-et-Morin-en-Brie
- Area^{1}: 5.67 km^{2} (2.19 sq mi)
- Elevation: 120 m (390 ft)
- Highest elevation: 184 m (604 ft)
- Lowest elevation: 107 m (351 ft)
- Population (2021): 104
  - Density: 18.3/km^{2} (47.5/sq mi)
- Time zone: UTC+01:00 (CET)
  - Summer (DST): UTC+02:00 (CEST)
- Postal code: 02540
- ^{1} French Land Register data, which excludes lakes, ponds, glaciers > 1 km^{2} (0.386 sq mi or 247 acres) and river estuaries.

La Celle-sous-Montmirail (French pronunciation: [la sɛl su mɔ̃miʁaj], literally La Celle under Montmirail) is a former commune in the department of Aisne in northern France. On 1 January 2016, it was merged into the new commune Dhuys-et-Morin-en-Brie.

== See also ==
- Communes of the Aisne department
