= The Battle of Montmirail =

Painting by Horace Vernet

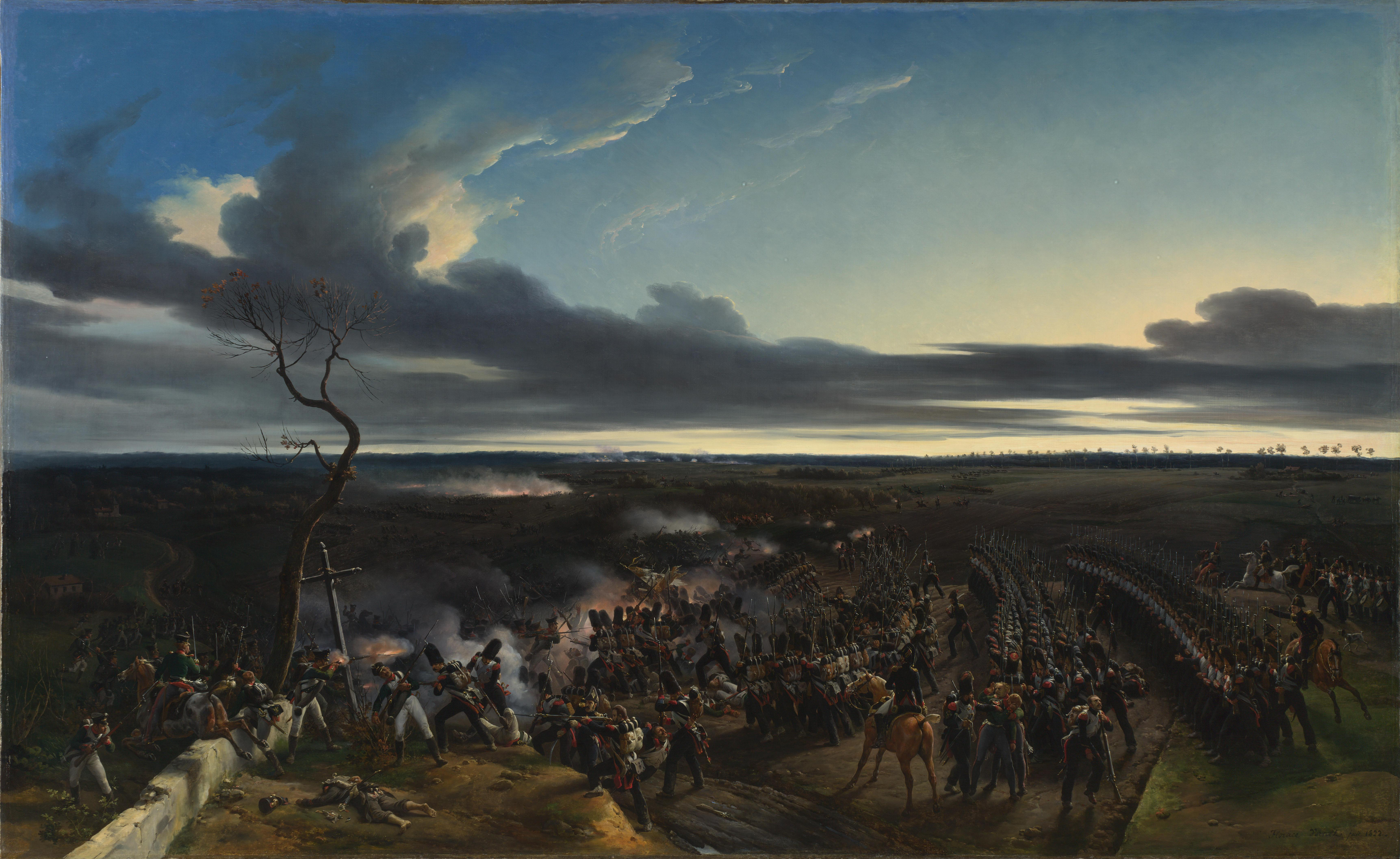
- Artist: Horace Vernet
- Year: 1822
- Medium: Oil on canvas
- Dimensions: 178.4 cm × 290.2 cm (70.2 in × 114.3 in)
- Location: National Gallery, London

The Battle of Montmirail is an 1822 history painting by the French artist Horace Vernet. It depicts the 1814 Battle of Montmirail during the Napoleonic Wars, won by Napoleon over the Coalition. It was one of four battle scenes Vernet painted on a commission by the Duke of Orleans, a cousin of Louis XVIII and himself a future monarch of France. Vernet received a total of thirty eight thousand francs for the four works.

== The battle ==
The Battle of Montrmirail is one of the final victories of the French emperor Napoleon. Fought on 11 February 1814 during the Six Days' Campaign, Napoleon's success there ultimately didn't prevent the fall of Paris and his abdication two months later.

== The painting ==
When two of his works were rejected for the Salon of 1822, Vernet pulled all but one of his paintings from the exhibition including this one. Instead, he chose to include it in his private exhibition of his works in his own studios. However, two years later it was finally exhibited at the Salon of 1824 to acclaim. The author Stendhal hailed it as "Horace Vernet's masterpiece" and praised it for its romanticism. Today it is in the collection of the National Gallery in London.

== Bibliography ==
- Harkett, Daniel & Hornstein, Katie (ed.) Horace Vernet and the Thresholds of Nineteenth-Century Visual Culture. Dartmouth College Press, 2017.
- Hornstein, Katie. Picturing War in France, 1792–1856. Yale University Press, 2018.
- Thoma, Julia. The Final Spectacle: Military Painting under the Second Empire, 1855–1867. Walter de Gruyter, 2019.
