= Dhuys et Morin-en-Brie =

- Commune
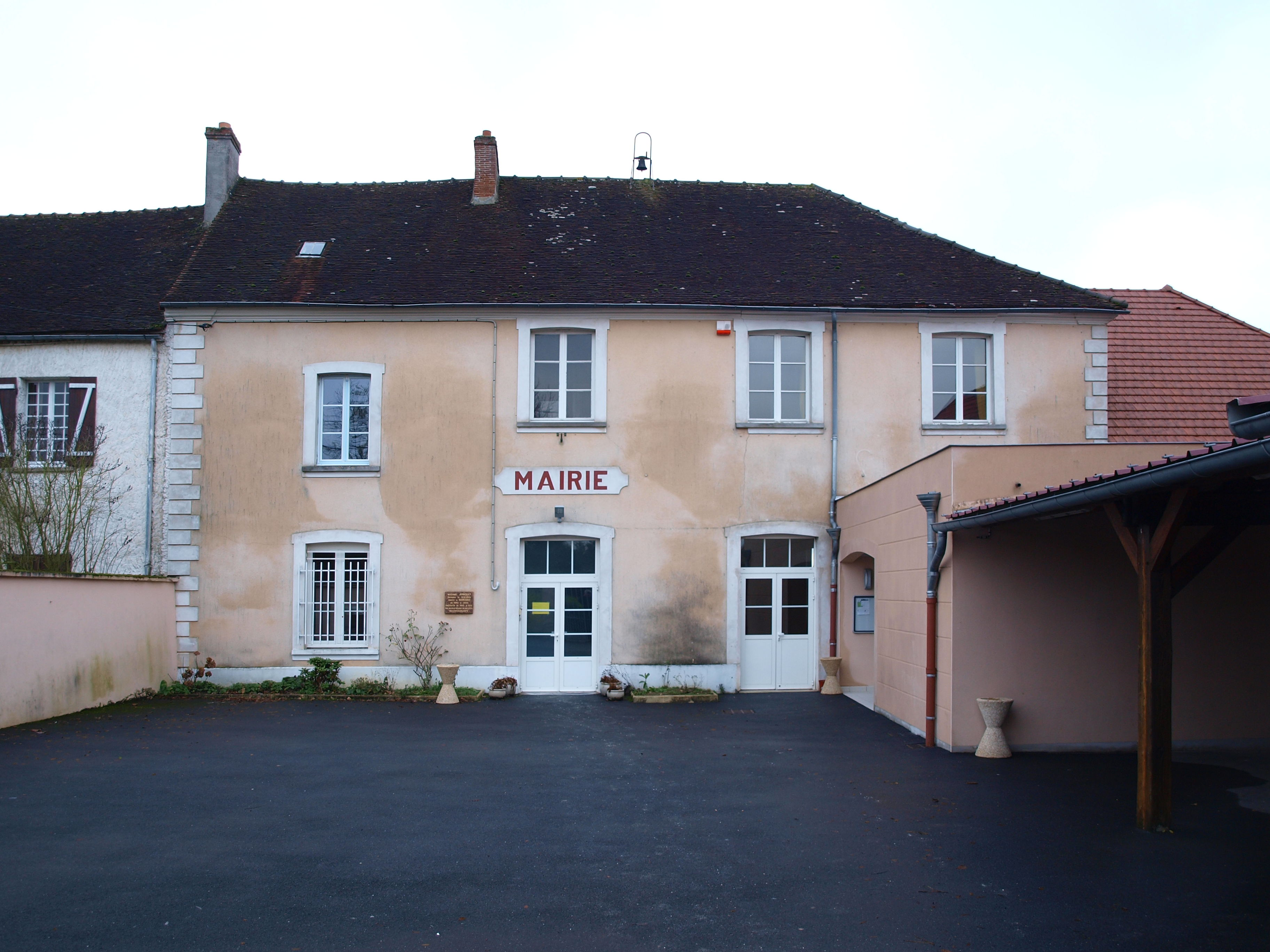
- The town hall of Marchais-en-Brie

- Coat of arms
- Location of Dhuys et Morin-en-Brie
- Location within France Location within Hauts-de-France
- Coordinates: 48°53′02″N 3°29′10″E
- Country: France
- Region: Hauts-de-France
- Department: Aisne
- Arrondissement: Château-Thierry
- Canton: Essômes-sur-Marne
- Intercommunality: CA Région de Château-Thierry

Government
  - Mayor (2026–32): Alain Moroy
- Area^{1}: 40.04 km^{2} (15.46 sq mi)
- Population (2023): 821
  - Density: 20.5/km^{2} (53.1/sq mi)
- Time zone: UTC+01:00 (CET)
  - Summer (DST): UTC+02:00 (CEST)
- INSEE/Postal code: 02458 /02540
- ^{1} French Land Register data, which excludes lakes, ponds, glaciers > 1 km^{2} (0.386 sq mi or 247 acres) and river estuaries.

Dhuys et Morin-en-Brie (French pronunciation: [dɥis e mɔʁɛ̃ ɑ̃ bʁi]) is a commune in the Aisne department of northern France. The municipality was established on 1 January 2016 and consists of the former communes of Artonges, La Celle-sous-Montmirail, Fontenelle-en-Brie and Marchais-en-Brie.

== See also ==
- Communes of the Aisne department
