= Marchais-en-Brie =

- Part of Dhuys-et-Morin-en-Brie
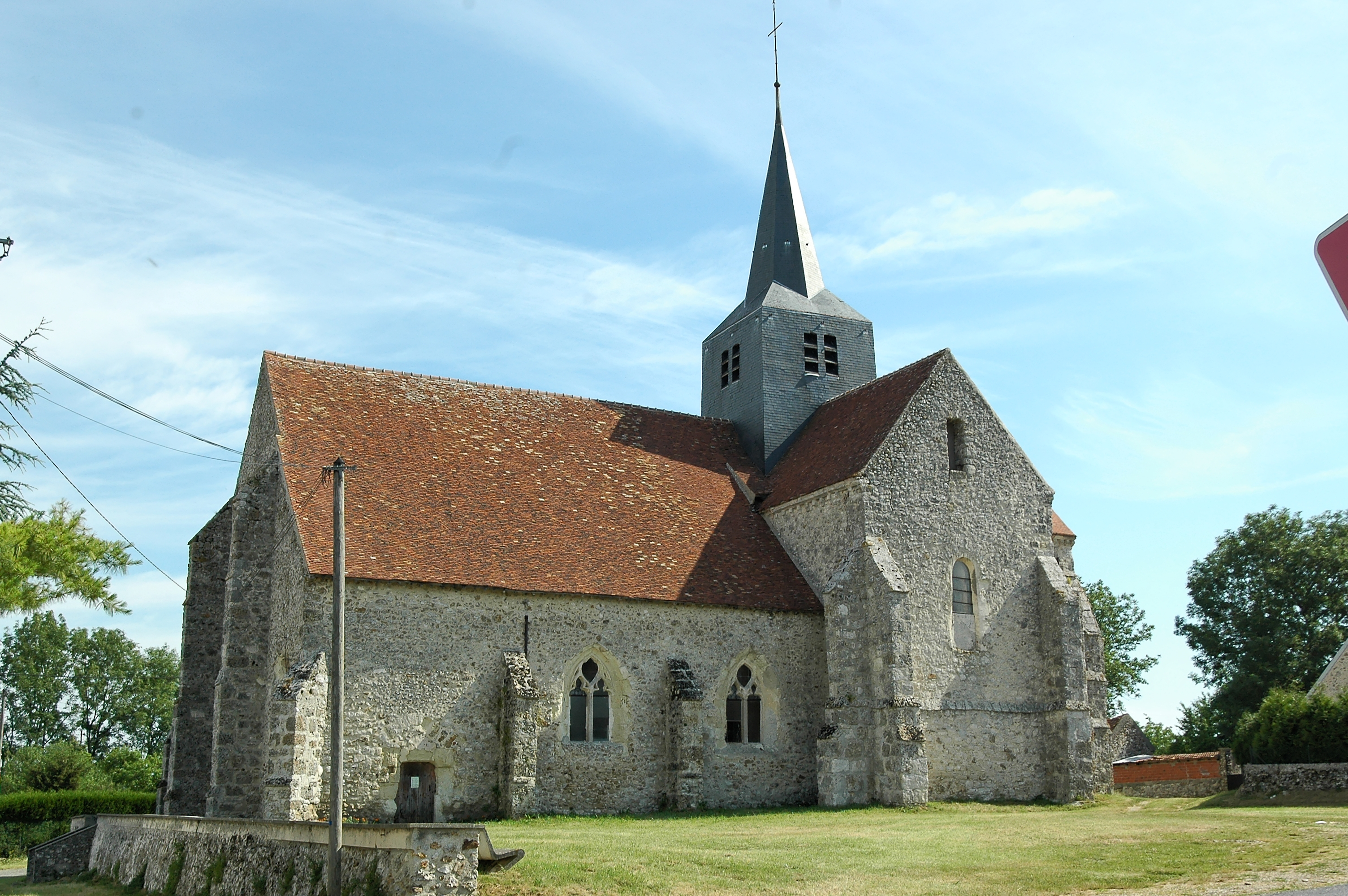

- Coat of arms
- Location of Marchais-en-Brie
- Location within France Location within Hauts-de-France
- Coordinates: 48°53′05″N 3°29′05″E
- Country: France
- Region: Hauts-de-France
- Department: Aisne
- Arrondissement: Château-Thierry
- Canton: Condé-en-Brie
- Commune: Dhuys-et-Morin-en-Brie
- Area^{1}: 12.78 km^{2} (4.93 sq mi)
- Elevation: 210 m (690 ft)
- Highest elevation: 212 m (696 ft)
- Lowest elevation: 112 m (367 ft)
- Population (2021): 330
  - Density: 26/km^{2} (67/sq mi)
- Time zone: UTC+01:00 (CET)
  - Summer (DST): UTC+02:00 (CEST)
- Postal code: 02540
- ^{1} French Land Register data, which excludes lakes, ponds, glaciers > 1 km^{2} (0.386 sq mi or 247 acres) and river estuaries.

Marchais-en-Brie (French pronunciation: [maʁʃɛ ɑ̃ bʁi], literally Marchais in Brie) is a former commune in the department of Aisne in northern France. On 1 January 2016, it was merged into the new commune Dhuys-et-Morin-en-Brie.

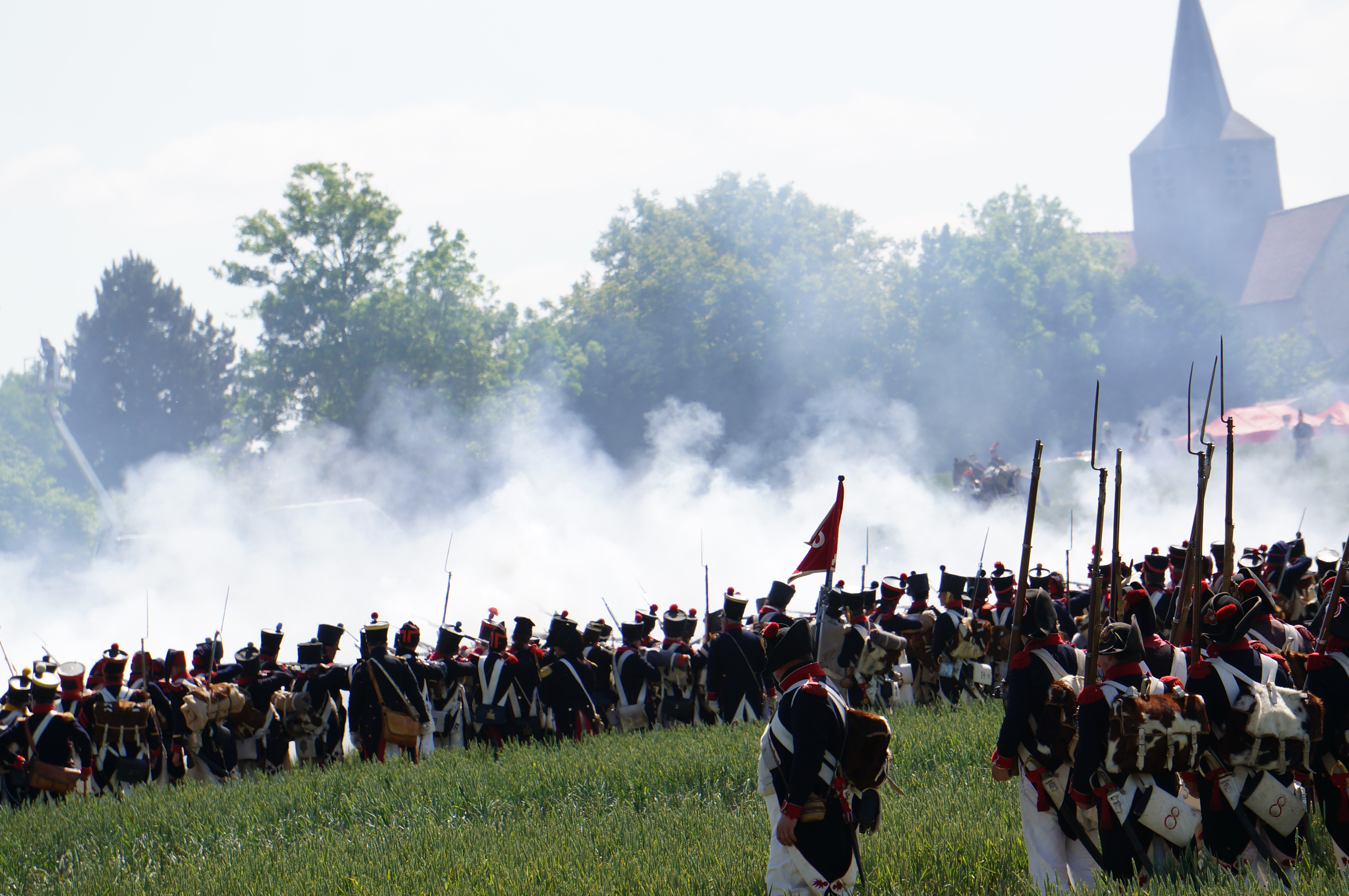
Napoleonic Wars reenactments, battle of Montmirail.

== See also ==
- Communes of the Aisne department
