= Fontenelle-en-Brie =

- Part of Dhuys-et-Morin-en-Brie
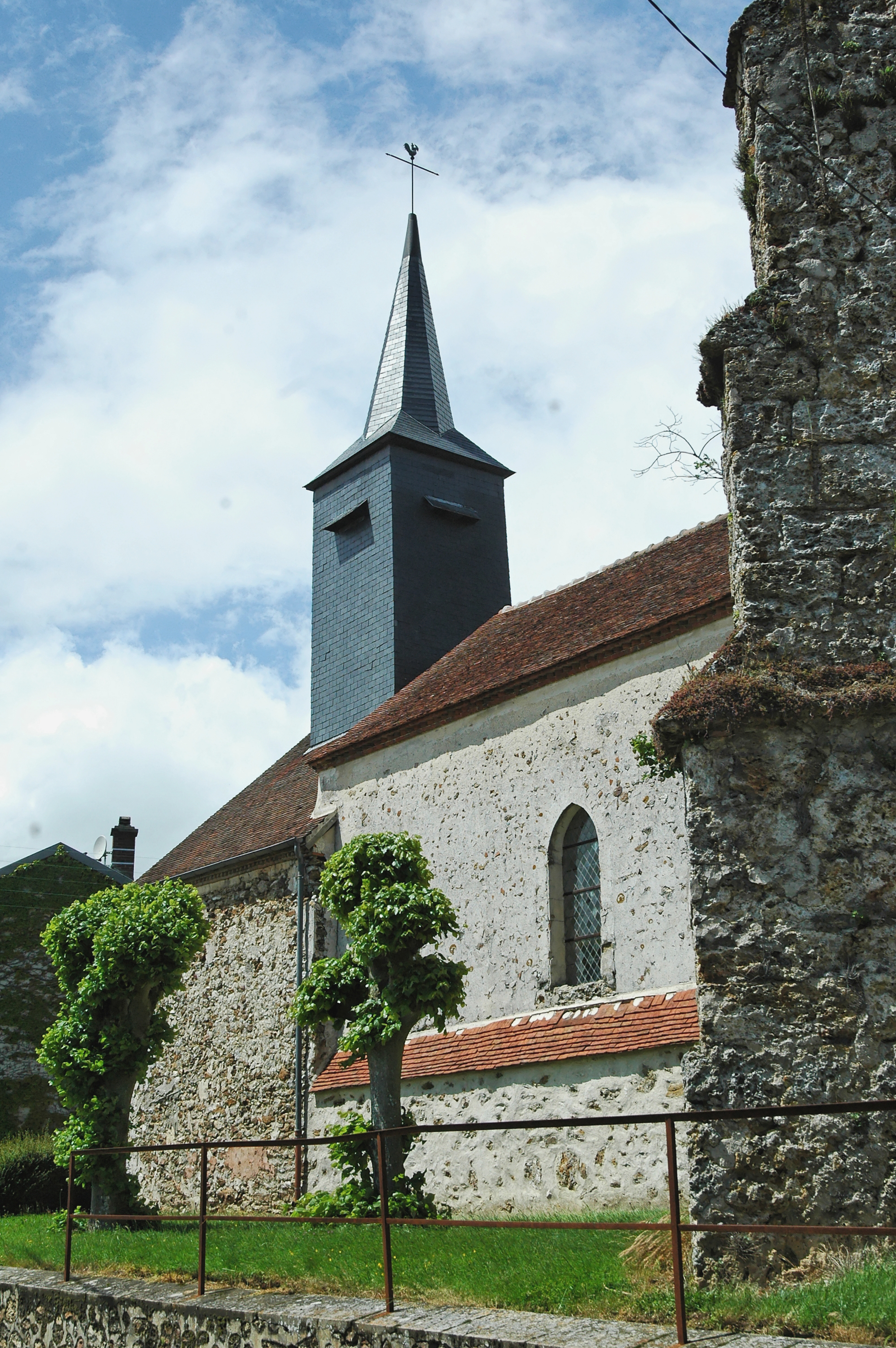
- Location of Fontenelle-en-Brie
- Location within France Location within Hauts-de-France
- Coordinates: 48°55′09″N 3°28′44″E
- Country: France
- Region: Hauts-de-France
- Department: Aisne
- Arrondissement: Château-Thierry
- Canton: Condé-en-Brie
- Commune: Dhuys-et-Morin-en-Brie
- Area^{1}: 8.47 km^{2} (3.27 sq mi)
- Elevation: 212 m (696 ft)
- Highest elevation: 222 m (728 ft)
- Lowest elevation: 188 m (617 ft)
- Population (2021): 217
  - Density: 25.6/km^{2} (66.4/sq mi)
- Time zone: UTC+01:00 (CET)
  - Summer (DST): UTC+02:00 (CEST)
- Postal code: 02540
- ^{1} French Land Register data, which excludes lakes, ponds, glaciers > 1 km^{2} (0.386 sq mi or 247 acres) and river estuaries.

Fontenelle-en-Brie (French pronunciation: [fɔ̃tnɛl ɑ̃ bʁi], literally Fontenelle in Brie) is a former commune in the department of Aisne in northern France. On 1 January 2016, it was merged into the new commune Dhuys-et-Morin-en-Brie.

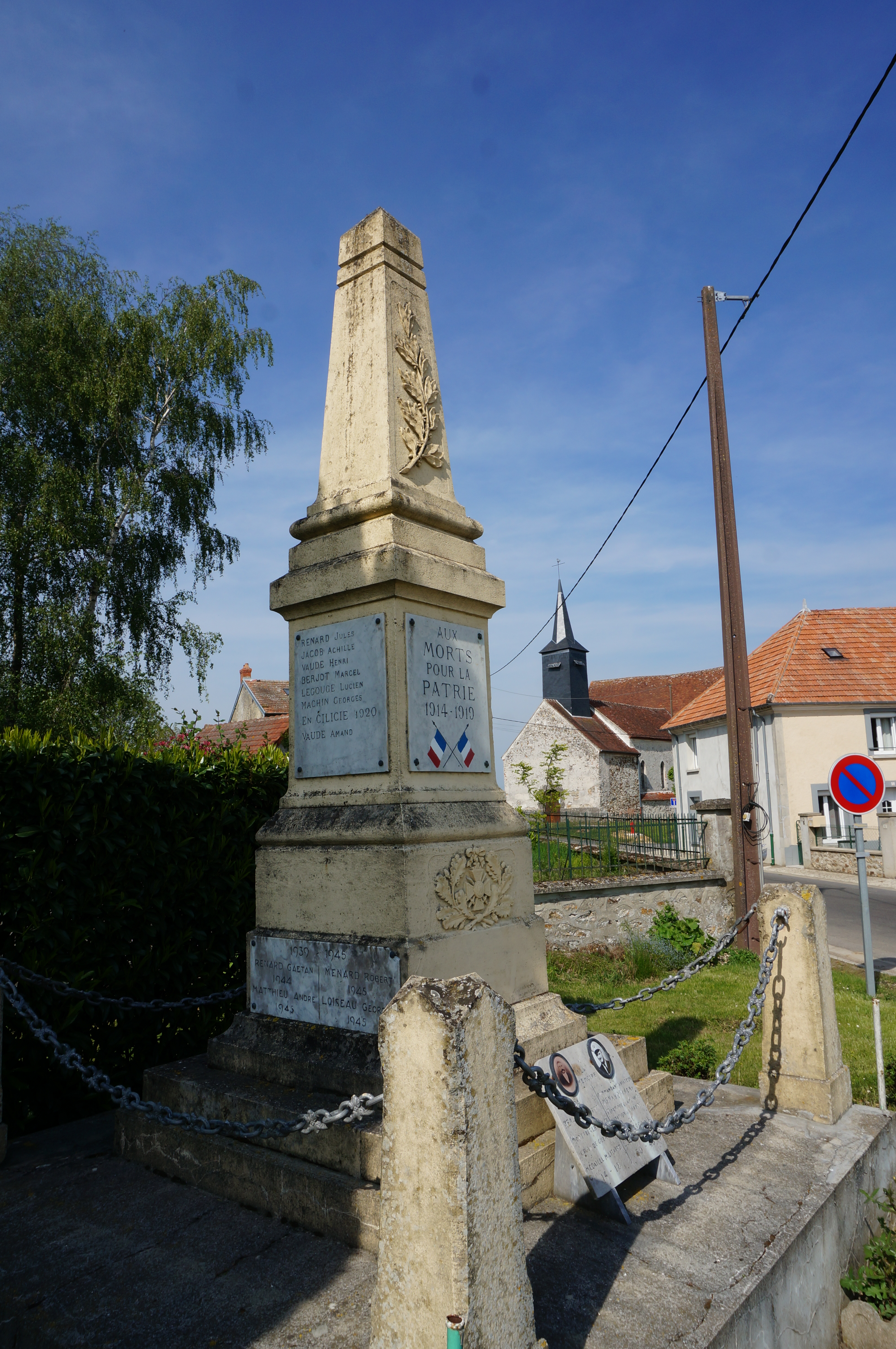
War memorial and church.

== See also ==
- Communes of the Aisne department
