= Viffort =

Commune in northern France

- Commune
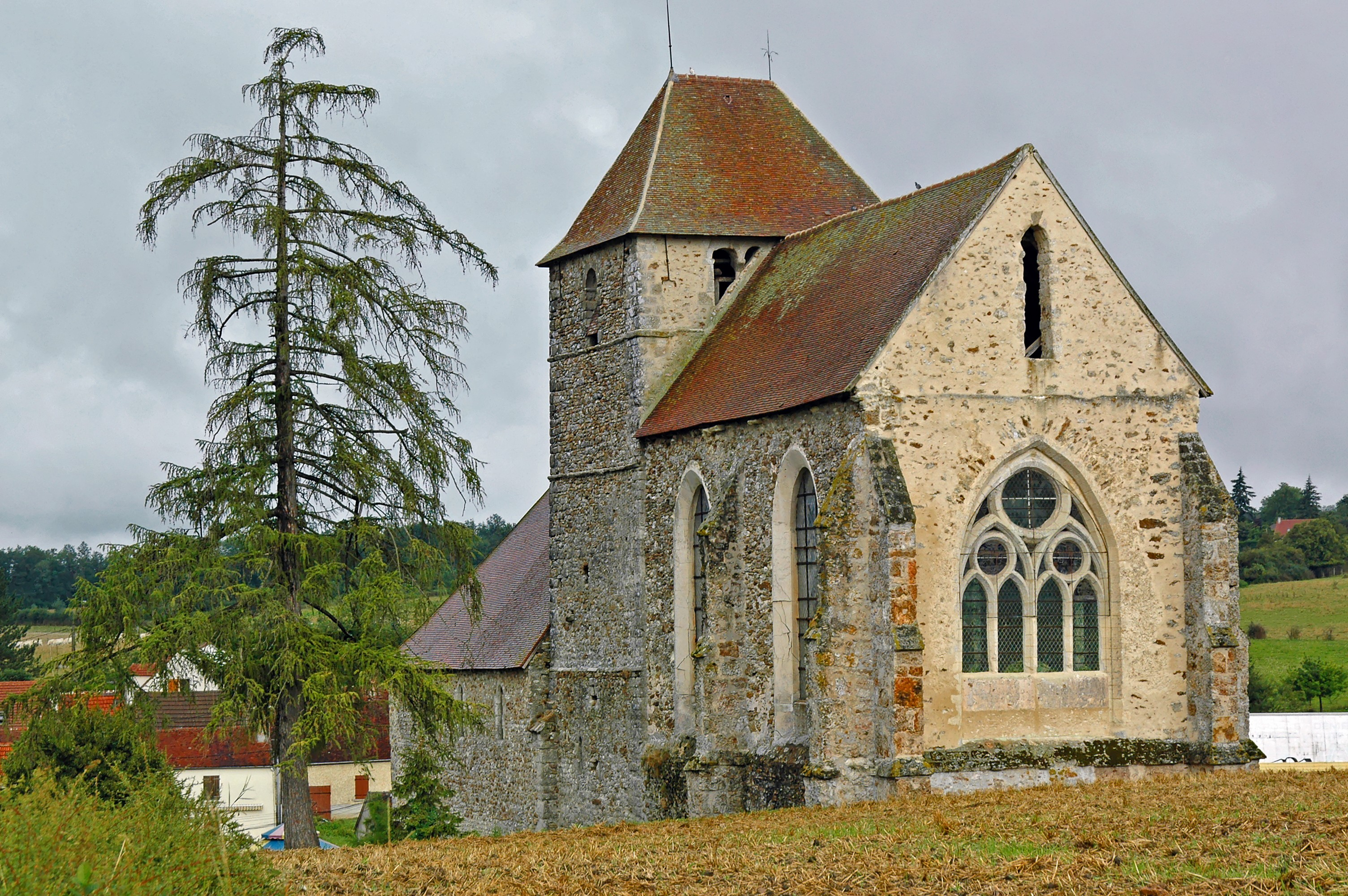
- The church of Viffort
- Location of Viffort
- Location within France Location within Hauts-de-France
- Coordinates: 48°57′43″N 3°27′31″E
- Country: France
- Region: Hauts-de-France
- Department: Aisne
- Arrondissement: Château-Thierry
- Canton: Essômes-sur-Marne
- Intercommunality: CA Région de Château-Thierry

Government
  - Mayor (2026–32): Didier Bandry
- Area^{1}: 9.83 km^{2} (3.80 sq mi)
- Elevation: 200 m (660 ft)
- Highest elevation: 224 m (735 ft)
- Lowest elevation: 159 m (522 ft)
- Population (2023): 310
  - Density: 32/km^{2} (82/sq mi)
- Time zone: UTC+01:00 (CET)
  - Summer (DST): UTC+02:00 (CEST)
- INSEE/Postal code: 02800 /02540
- ^{1} French Land Register data, which excludes lakes, ponds, glaciers > 1 km^{2} (0.386 sq mi or 247 acres) and river estuaries.

Viffort (French pronunciation: [vifɔʁ]) is a commune in the Aisne department in Hauts-de-France in northern France.

== Population ==
Historical population
| Year | Pop. | ±% p.a. |
|---|---|---|
| 1968 | 207 | — |
| 1975 | 186 | −1.52% |
| 1982 | 207 | +1.54% |
| 1990 | 236 | +1.65% |
| 1999 | 212 | −1.18% |
| 2007 | 296 | +4.26% |
| 2012 | 331 | +2.26% |
| 2017 | 320 | −0.67% |
| 2023 | 310 | −0.53% |
Source: INSEE

== See also ==
- Communes of the Aisne department
