= Montmirail, Marne =

Montmirail
- Commune
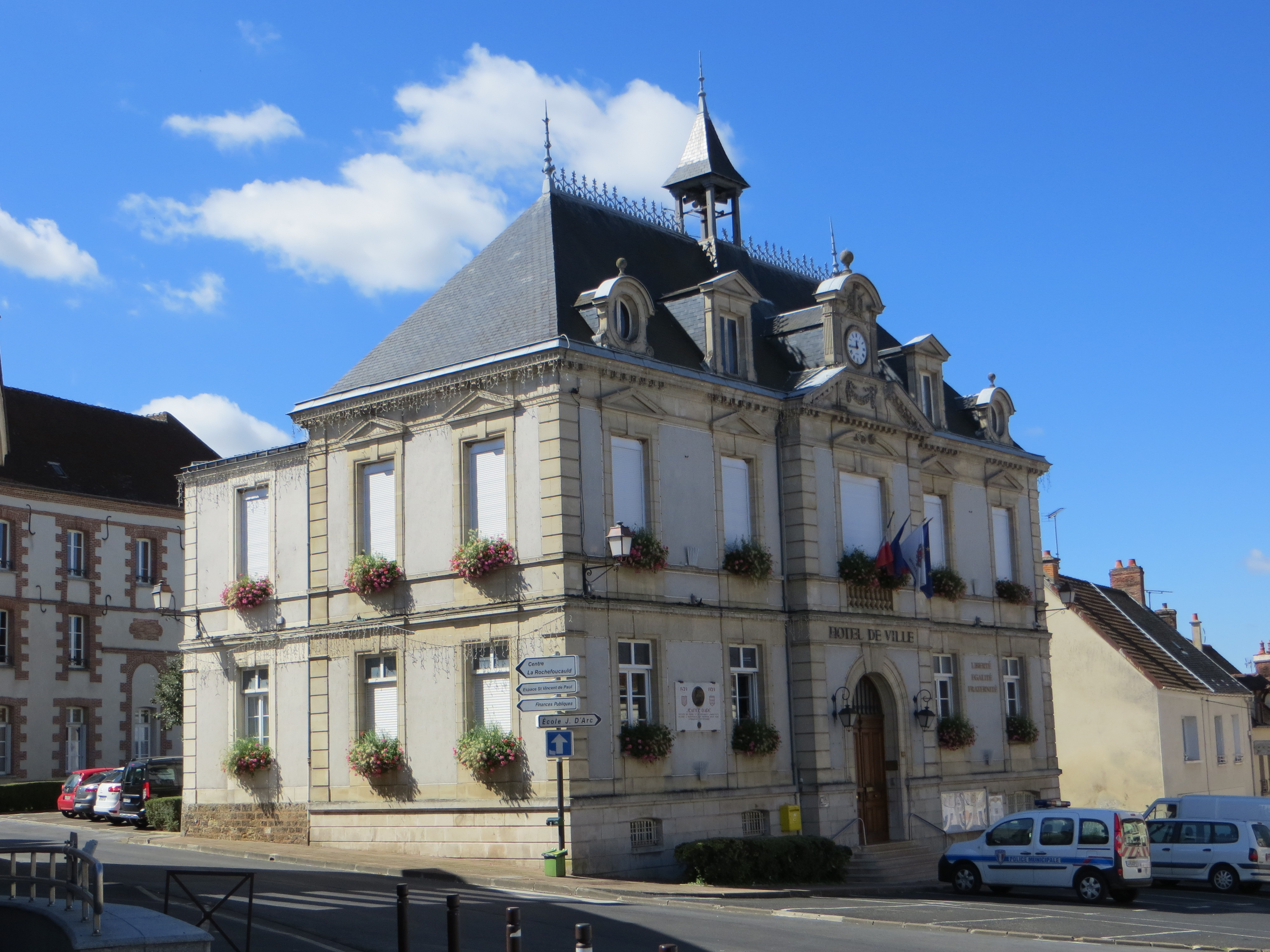
- The town hall in Montmirail
- Location of Montmirail
- Location within France Location within Grand Est
- Coordinates: 48°52′13″N 3°32′14″E
- Country: France
- Region: Grand Est
- Department: Marne
- Arrondissement: Épernay
- Canton: Sézanne-Brie et Champagne
- Intercommunality: CC Brie Champenoise

Government
  - Mayor (2024–2026): Etienne Dhuicq
- Area^{1}: 48.82 km^{2} (18.85 sq mi)
- Elevation: 205 m (673 ft)
- Population (2023): 3,535
  - Density: 72.41/km^{2} (187.5/sq mi)
- Time zone: UTC+01:00 (CET)
  - Summer (DST): UTC+02:00 (CEST)
- INSEE/Postal code: 51380 /51210
- ^{1} French Land Register data, which excludes lakes, ponds, glaciers > 1 km^{2} (0.386 sq mi or 247 acres) and river estuaries.

Montmirail (French pronunciation: [mɔ̃miʁaj]) is a commune in the Marne department in north-eastern France.

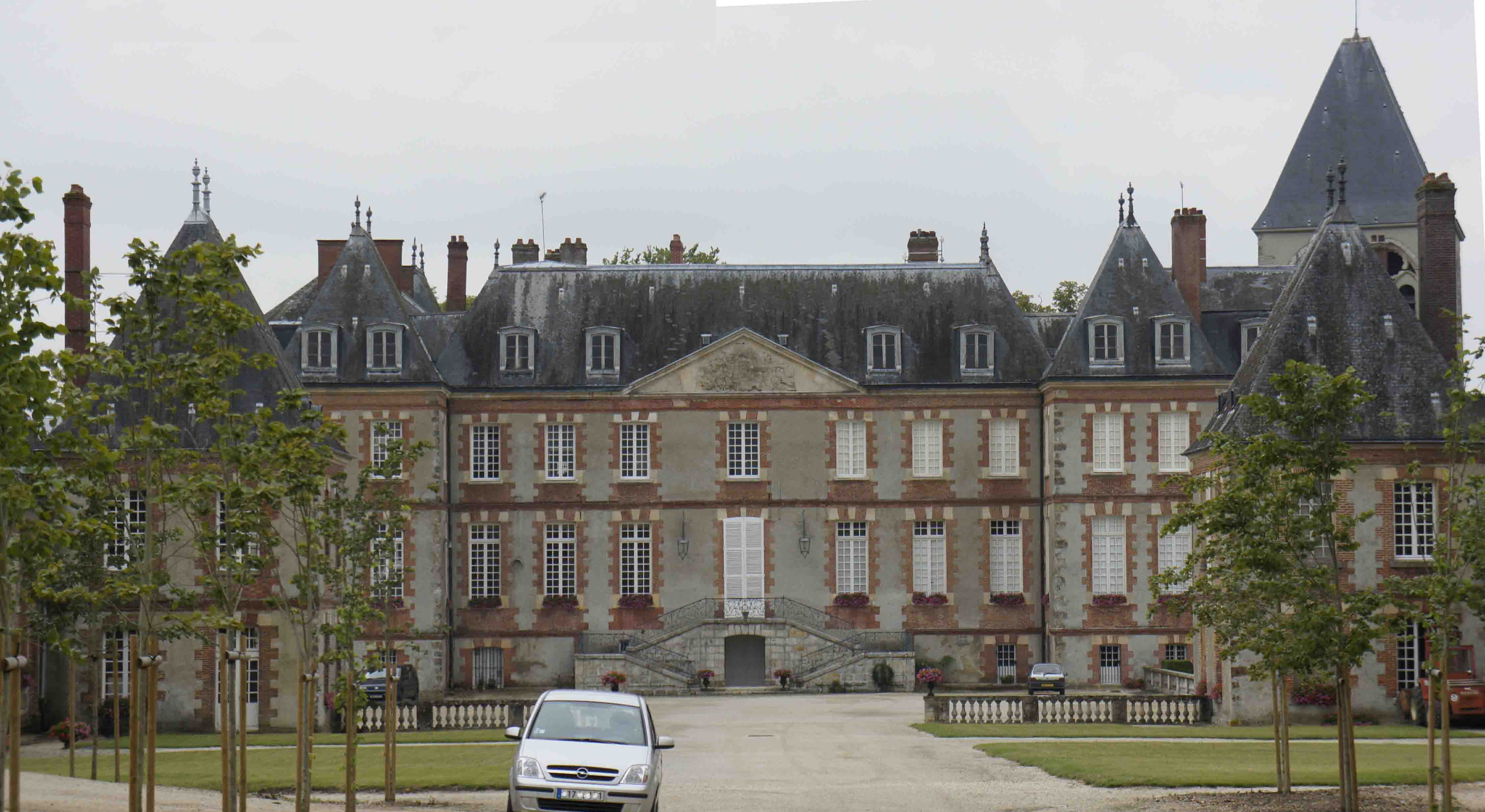
Castle, church

Jean François Paul de Gondi, cardinal de Retz (1613-1679), a French churchman, writer of memoirs, and agitator in the Fronde was born in Montmirail.

== Population ==
Historical population
Year	Pop.	±% p.a.
1968	3,061	—
1975	3,423	+1.61%
1982	3,696	+1.10%
1990	3,812	+0.39%
1999	3,783	−0.08%
2007	3,796	+0.04%
2012	3,742	−0.29%
2017	3,598	−0.78%
2023	3,535	−0.29%
Source: INSEE

== Town partnerships ==
- Hassocks, West Sussex, England, United Kingdom
- Wald-Michelbach, Hesse, Germany.

== See also ==
- Communes of the Marne department
