= Azy-sur-Marne =

- Commune
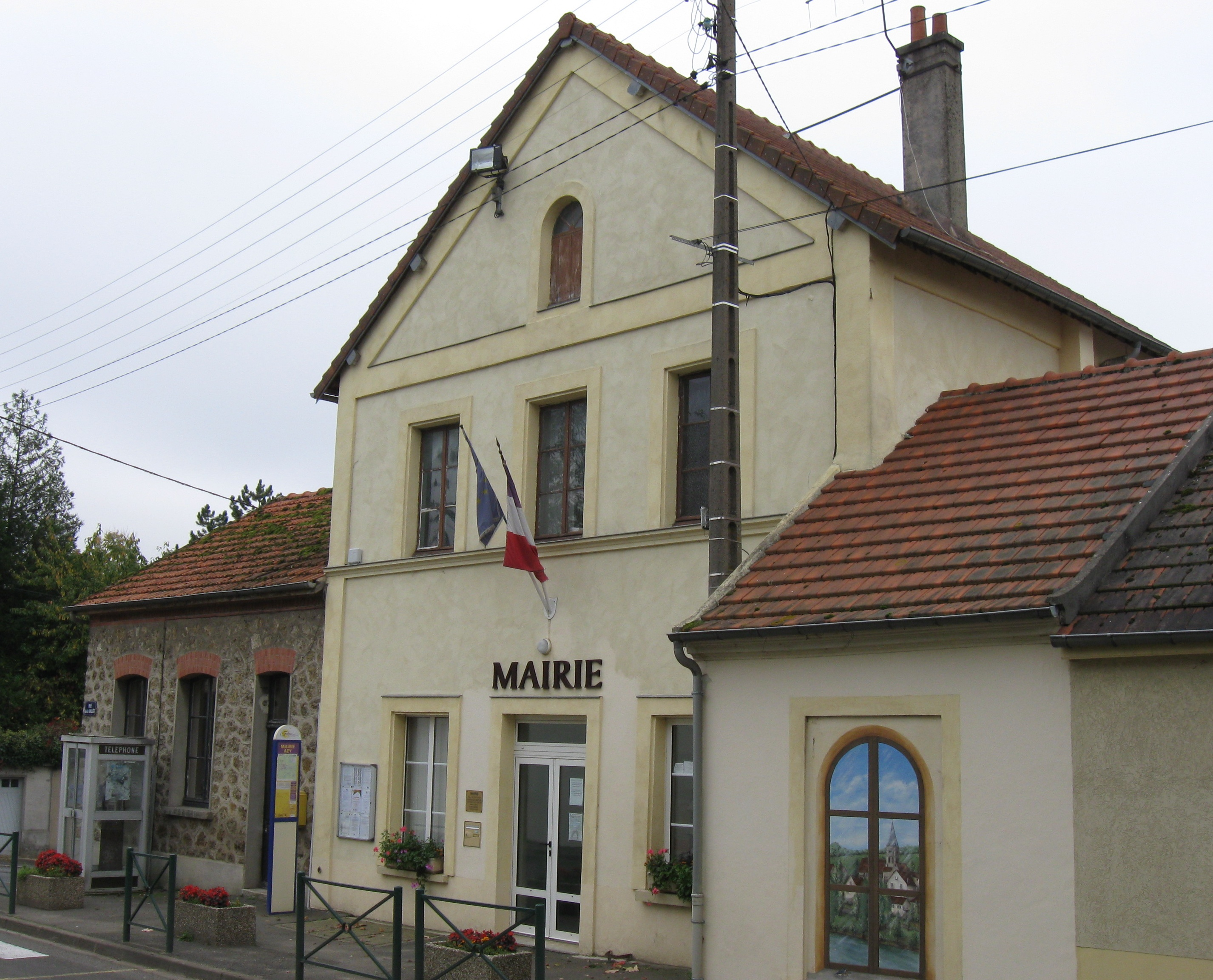
- Town hall
- Location of Azy-sur-Marne
- Location within France Location within Hauts-de-France
- Coordinates: 49°00′07″N 3°22′01″E
- Country: France
- Region: Hauts-de-France
- Department: Aisne
- Arrondissement: Château-Thierry
- Canton: Essômes-sur-Marne
- Intercommunality: CA Région de Château-Thierry

Government
  - Mayor (2026–32): Séverine Gleize
- Area^{1}: 2.78 km^{2} (1.07 sq mi)
- Elevation: 60 m (200 ft)
- Highest elevation: 202 m (663 ft)
- Lowest elevation: 57 m (187 ft)
- Population (2023): 369
  - Density: 133/km^{2} (344/sq mi)
- Time zone: UTC+01:00 (CET)
  - Summer (DST): UTC+02:00 (CEST)
- INSEE/Postal code: 02042 /02400
- ^{1} French Land Register data, which excludes lakes, ponds, glaciers > 1 km^{2} (0.386 sq mi or 247 acres) and river estuaries.

Azy-sur-Marne (French pronunciation: [azi syʁ maʁn], literally Azy on Marne) is a commune in the department of Aisne in the Hauts-de-France region of northern France.

== Geography ==
Azy-sur-Marne is located 4 km southwest of Château-Thierry and 20 km east of Montreuil-aux-Lions. It can be accessed by the D969 road from Essômes-sur-Marne in the north through the village then west through the commune and continuing south to Romeny-sur-Marne. There is also a country road going west to Mont de Bonneil. The commune is almost entirely farmland with small forests in the north and west. The commune is within the Appellation d'origine contrôlée zone of Aisne Champagne.

The southern border of the commune consists of the Marne river with no other identifiable watercourses in the commune.

== History ==
The village was severely damaged in the battles of the Marne in World War I.

== Politics and administration ==
=== List of Successive Mayors of Azy-sur-Marne ===
From	To	Name	Party	Notes
~1875	~1876	M. Bennard		
2001	2014	Peter Pastorelli	DVG	Served two consecutive terms in office from 2001 to 2014.
2014	2020	Jean-Pierre Lantoine	SE	Completed a full term from 2014 to 2020 and is currently recognized as a retired professional.
2020	Present	Séverine Gleize		She was first elected in May 2020 and was recently re-elected in the first round of the March 2026 municipal elections.

== Population ==
Historical population

Year	Pop.	±% p.a.
1793	253	—
1821	246	−0.10%
1846	245	−0.02%
1872	192	−0.93%
1901	194	+0.04%
1926	181	−0.28%
1946	167	−0.40%
1962	200	+1.13%
1968	222	+1.75%

Year	Pop.	±% p.a.
1975	286	+3.69%
1982	326	+1.89%
1990	372	+1.66%
1999	381	+0.27%
2007	374	−0.23%
2012	400	+1.35%
2017	389	−0.56%
2023	369	−0.88%

Source: EHESS and INSEE

== Sites and Monuments ==
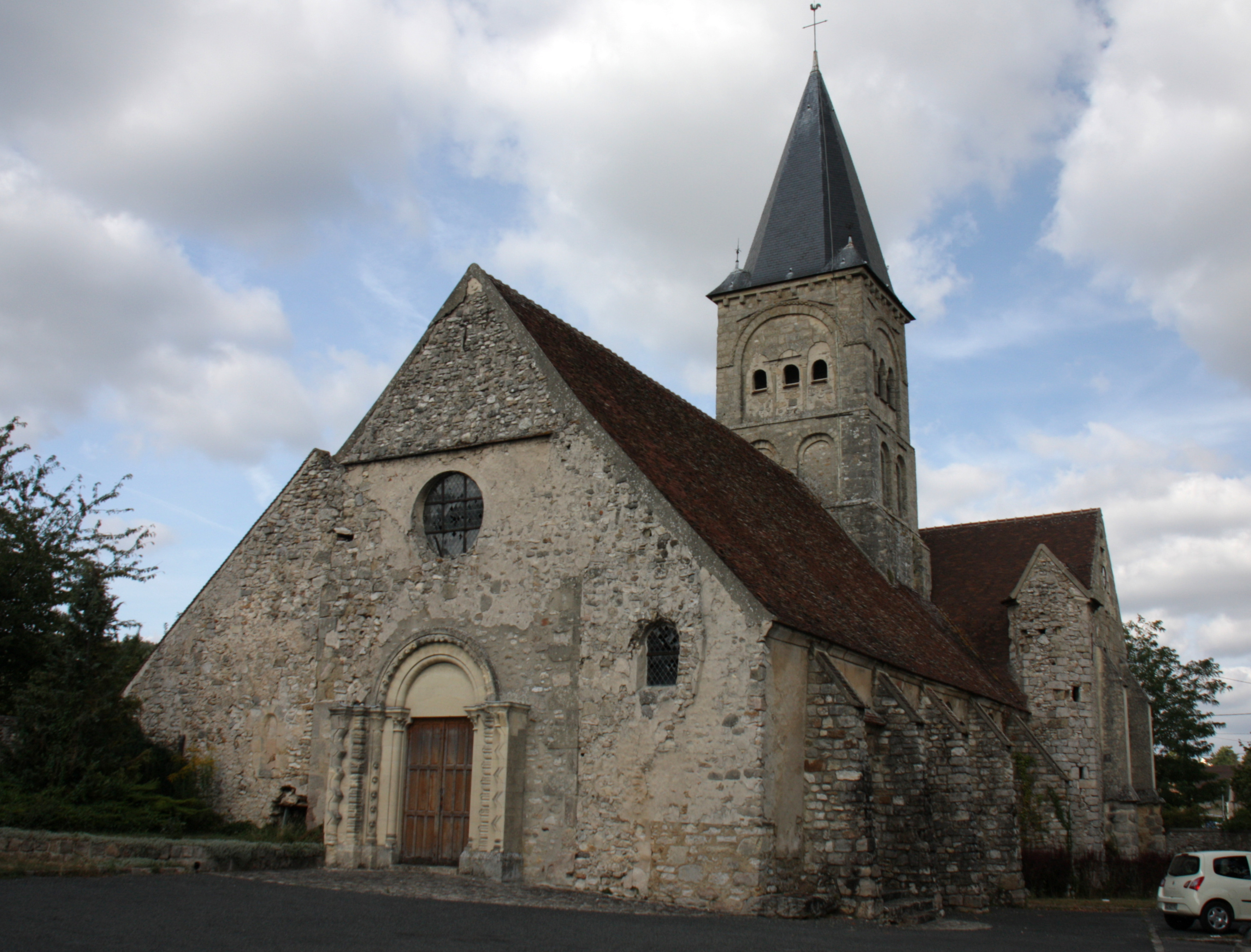
The church of Saint Felix

The commune has two sites that are registered as historical monuments:

- The Church of Saint Felix (12th century)
- The Chateau Park

Other sites of interest

- the Mercier Vineyard for Moët & Chandon Champagne

== See also ==
- Communes of the Aisne department
