= Arrondissement of Château-Thierry =

Coordinates: 49°02′39″N 3°24′05″E

Château-Thierry
- Arrondissement
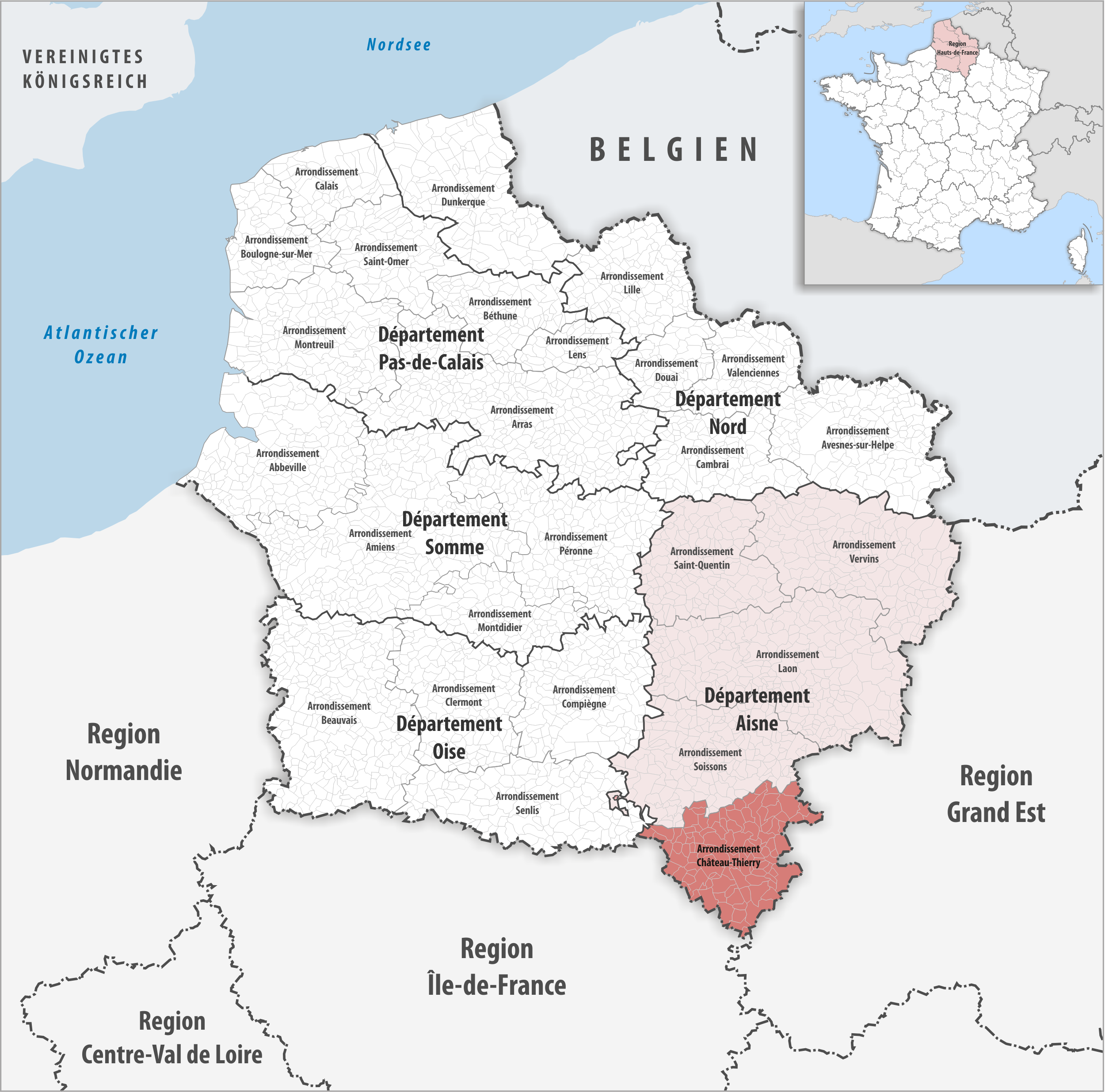
- Location within the region Hauts-de-France
- Country: France
- Region: Hauts-de-France
- Department: Aisne
- No. of communes: {{{nbcomm}}}
- Area: 1,115.2 km^{2} (430.6 sq mi)
- Population (2023): 69,264
  - Density: 62.109/km^{2} (160.86/sq mi)
- INSEE code: 021

The arrondissement of Château-Thierry is an arrondissement of France in the Aisne department in the Hauts-de-France region. It has 108 communes. Its population is 69,781 (2021), and its area is 1,115.2 km^{2} (430.6 sq mi).

== Composition ==
The communes of the arrondissement of Château-Thierry, and their INSEE codes, are:

1. Armentières-sur-Ourcq (02023)
2. Azy-sur-Marne (02042)
3. Barzy-sur-Marne (02051)
4. Belleau (02062)
5. Beuvardes (02083)
6. Blesmes (02094)
7. Bonneil (02098)
8. Bonnesvalyn (02099)
9. Bouresches (02105)
10. Brasles (02114)
11. Brécy (02119)
12. Brumetz (02125)
13. Bruyères-sur-Fère (02127)
14. Bussiares (02137)
15. Bézu-Saint-Germain (02085)
16. Bézu-le-Guéry (02084)
17. Celles-lès-Condé (02146)
18. La Chapelle-sur-Chézy (02162)
19. Charly-sur-Marne (02163)
20. Le Charmel (02164)
21. Chartèves (02166)
22. Château-Thierry (02168)
23. Chézy-en-Orxois (02185)
24. Chézy-sur-Marne (02186)
25. Chierry (02187)
26. Cierges (02193)
27. Coincy (02203)
28. Condé-en-Brie (02209)
29. Connigis (02213)
30. Coulonges-Cohan (02220)
31. Coupru (02221)
32. Courboin (02223)
33. Courchamps (02225)
34. Courmont (02227)
35. Courtemont-Varennes (02228)
36. Crézancy (02239)
37. La Croix-sur-Ourcq (02241)
38. Crouttes-sur-Marne (02242)
39. Dhuys-et-Morin-en-Brie (02458)
40. Domptin (02268)
41. Dravegny (02271)
42. Épaux-Bézu (02279)
43. Épieds (02280)
44. L'Épine-aux-Bois (02281)
45. Essises (02289)
46. Essômes-sur-Marne (02290)
47. Étampes-sur-Marne (02292)
48. Étrépilly (02297)
49. Fère-en-Tardenois (02305)
50. Fossoy (02328)
51. Fresnes-en-Tardenois (02332)
52. Gandelu (02339)
53. Gland (02347)
54. Goussancourt (02351)
55. Grisolles (02356)
56. Hautevesnes (02375)
57. Jaulgonne (02389)
58. Latilly (02411)
59. Licy-Clignon (02428)
60. Loupeigne (02442)
61. Lucy-le-Bocage (02443)
62. Mareuil-en-Dôle (02462)
63. Marigny-en-Orxois (02465)
64. Mézy-Moulins (02484)
65. Mont-Saint-Père (02524)
66. Montfaucon (02505)
67. Monthiers (02509)
68. Monthurel (02510)
69. Montigny-l'Allier (02512)
70. Montigny-lès-Condé (02515)
71. Montlevon (02518)
72. Montreuil-aux-Lions (02521)
73. Nanteuil-Notre-Dame (02538)
74. Nesles-la-Montagne (02540)
75. Neuilly-Saint-Front (02543)
76. Nogent-l'Artaud (02555)
77. Nogentel (02554)
78. Pargny-la-Dhuys (02590)
79. Passy-sur-Marne (02595)
80. Pavant (02596)
81. Priez (02622)
82. Reuilly-Sauvigny (02645)
83. Rocourt-Saint-Martin (02649)
84. Romeny-sur-Marne (02653)
85. Ronchères (02655)
86. Rozet-Saint-Albin (02662)
87. Rozoy-Bellevalle (02664)
88. Saint-Eugène (02677)
89. Saint-Gengoulph (02679)
90. Saponay (02699)
91. Saulchery (02701)
92. Sergy (02712)
93. Seringes-et-Nesles (02713)
94. Sommelans (02724)
95. Torcy-en-Valois (02744)
96. Trélou-sur-Marne (02748)
97. Vallées-en-Champagne (02053)
98. Vendières (02777)
99. Verdilly (02781)
100. Veuilly-la-Poterie (02792)
101. Vézilly (02794)
102. Vichel-Nanteuil (02796)
103. Viels-Maisons (02798)
104. Viffort (02800)
105. Villeneuve-sur-Fère (02806)
106. Villers-Agron-Aiguizy (02809)
107. Villers-sur-Fère (02816)
108. Villiers-Saint-Denis (02818)

== History ==
The arrondissement of Château-Thierry was created in 1800, disbanded in 1926 and restored in 1942. At the January 2017 reorganization of the arrondissements of Aisne, it lost 10 communes to the arrondissement of Soissons.

As a result of the reorganisation of the cantons of France which came into effect in 2015, the borders of the cantons are no longer related to the borders of the arrondissements. The cantons of the arrondissement of Château-Thierry were, as of January 2015:

1. Charly-sur-Marne
2. Château-Thierry
3. Condé-en-Brie
4. Fère-en-Tardenois
5. Neuilly-Saint-Front

== Sub-prefects ==
- Renaud Donnedieu de Vabres : 1982–1985 : sub-prefect of the Château-Thierry arrondissement
