= Sergy =

Sergy may refer to the following places in France:

- Sergy, Ain, a commune in the department of Ain
- Sergy, Aisne, a commune in the department of Aisne
