= Armentières-sur-Ourcq =

- Commune
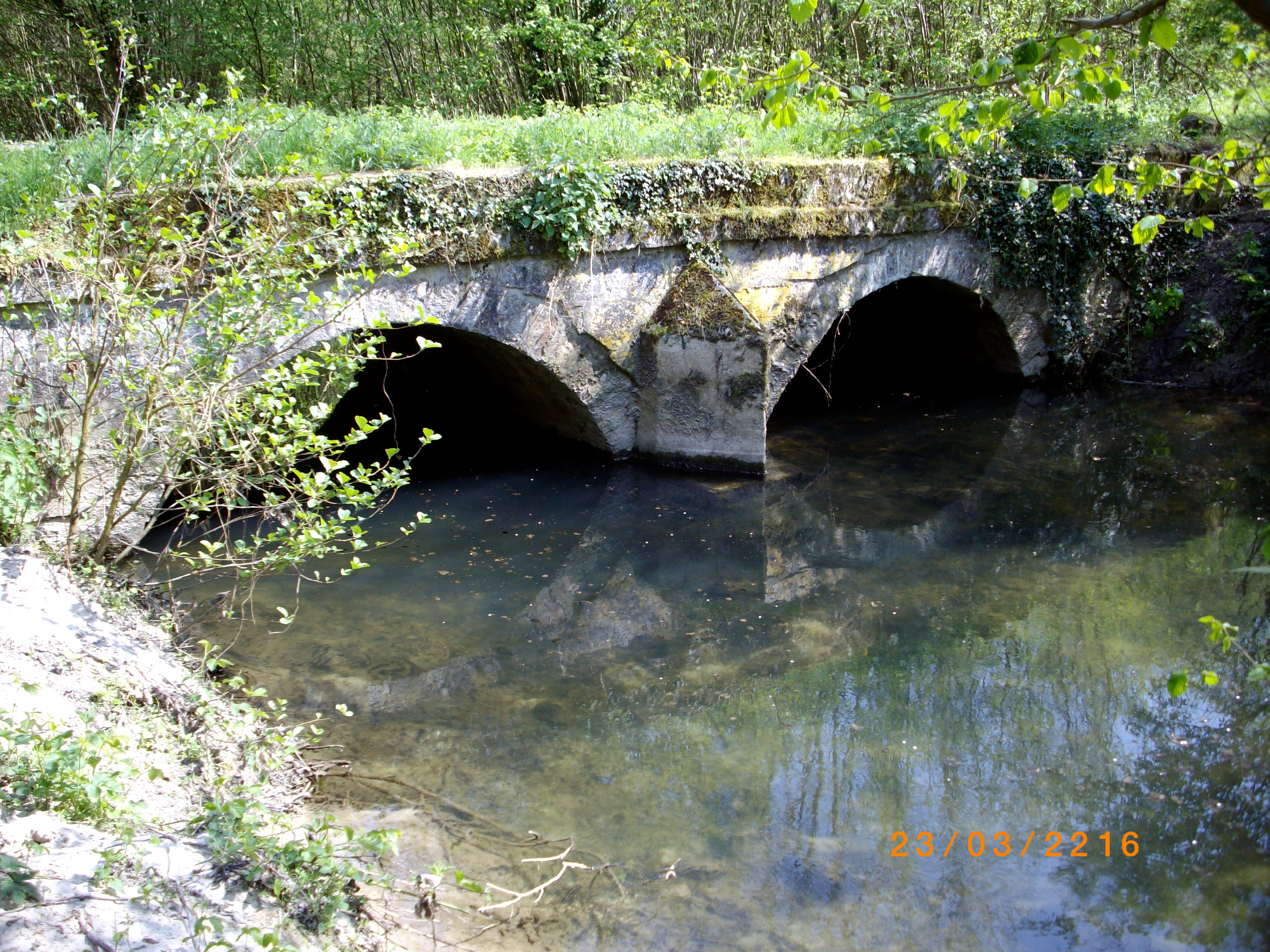
- One of the two "Bernard Bridges" over the Ourcq
- Location of Armentières-sur-Ourcq
- Location within France Location within Hauts-de-France
- Coordinates: 49°11′00″N 3°23′14″E
- Country: France
- Region: Hauts-de-France
- Department: Aisne
- Arrondissement: Château-Thierry
- Canton: Villers-Cotterêts
- Intercommunality: CA Région de Château-Thierry

Government
  - Mayor (2026–32): Gérard Ponthieux
- Area^{1}: 6.81 km^{2} (2.63 sq mi)
- Highest elevation: 151 m (495 ft)
- Lowest elevation: 87 m (285 ft)
- Population (2023): 96
  - Density: 14/km^{2} (37/sq mi)
- Time zone: UTC+01:00 (CET)
  - Summer (DST): UTC+02:00 (CEST)
- INSEE/Postal code: 02023 /02210
- ^{1} French Land Register data, which excludes lakes, ponds, glaciers > 1 km^{2} (0.386 sq mi or 247 acres) and river estuaries.

Armentières-sur-Ourcq (French pronunciation: [aʁmɑ̃tjɛʁ syʁ uʁk], literally Armentières on Ourcq) is a commune in the department of Aisne in the Hauts-de-France region of northern France.

== Geography ==
Armentières-sur-Ourcq is located some 30 km south of Soissons and 30 km south-east of Villers-Cotterêts. The D1 road runs through the south-west corner of the commune however the main access is on the D79 from La Croix-sur-Ourcq in the south-west running to the village then west to Nanteuil-Notre-Dame in the east. The D80 road also comes from Oulchy-le-Château in the north and continues south to Coincy. The commune is almost entirely farmland except for a belt of forest in the north.

The Ourcq river flows from east to west through the northern part of the commune and forming part of the northern border. The Ru Garnier stream flows from the south of the commune north through the village and continuing north to join the Ourcq river.

== Population ==
Historical population
| Year | Pop. | ±% p.a. |
|---|---|---|
| 1968 | 76 | — |
| 1975 | 76 | +0.00% |
| 1982 | 74 | −0.38% |
| 1990 | 85 | +1.75% |
| 1999 | 105 | +2.38% |
| 2007 | 101 | −0.48% |
| 2012 | 105 | +0.78% |
| 2017 | 103 | −0.38% |
| 2023 | 96 | −1.17% |
Source: INSEE

== Sites and monuments ==
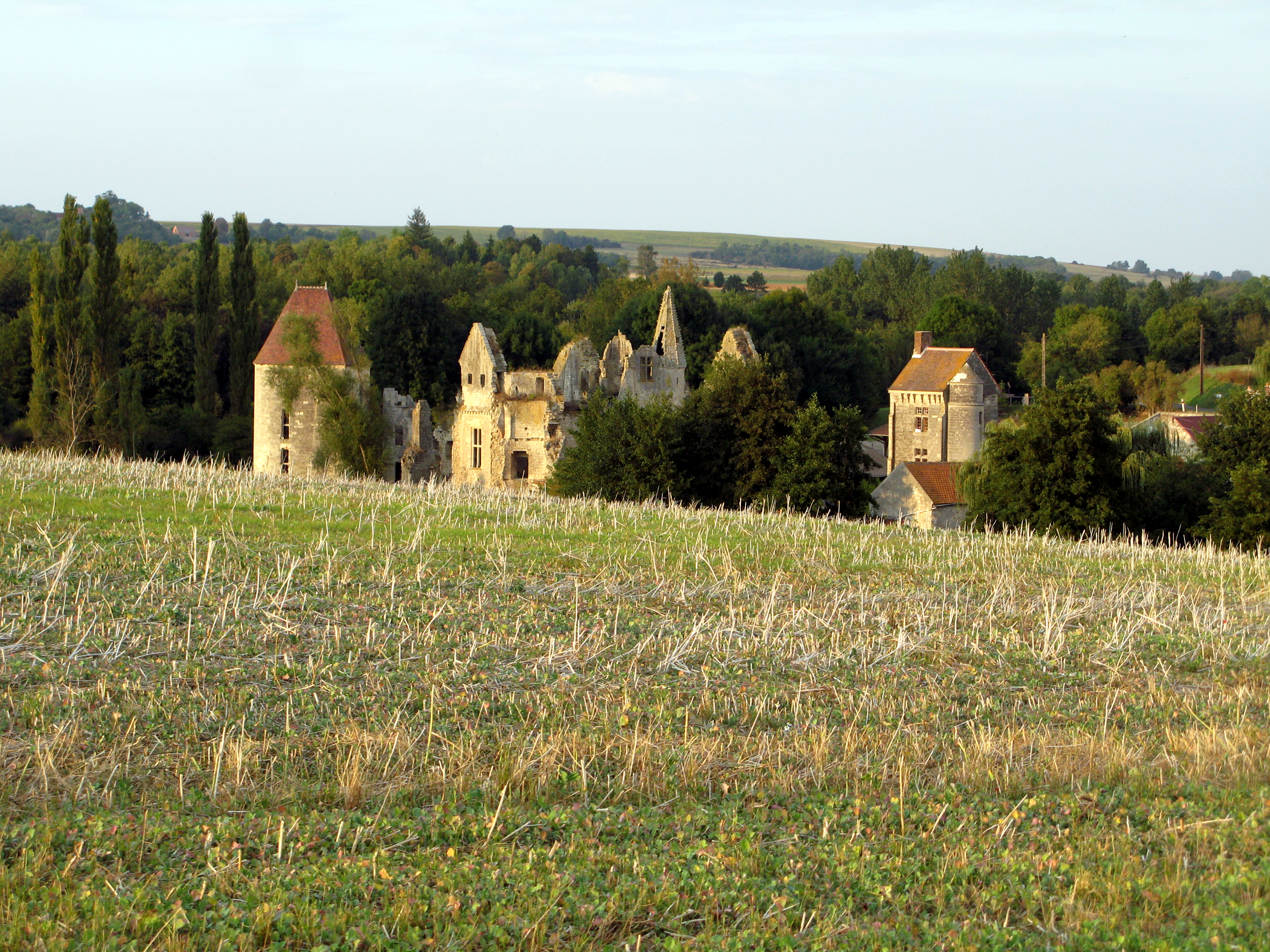
Remains of the chateau

The commune has two sites that are registered as historical monuments:

- The Château of Armentières (12th century). Its postern has been classified as a historical monument since 25 January 1921. It is currently privately owned and is visited every year during European Heritage Days. Since 2004 it has benefited from restoration works supported by the DRAC of Picardy and the General Council of Aisne
- The Bernard bridges (17th century) spanning the Ourcq.

Other sites of interest

- The Church (13th century) was severely damaged during the First World War and almost entirely rebuilt. It contains two items that are registered as historical objects:
  - A Bas-relief: Pietà Donatrice and patron (16th century)
  - A Funeral Monument of the Lords of Armentières (16th century)

== Notable people linked to the commune ==
- Louis de Brienne de Conflans d'Armentières (1711–1774), Marshal of France
- Charles Louis Gabriel de Conflans d'Armentieres (1772–1849), military officer and French politician of the 18th and 19th centuries

== See also ==
- Communes of the Aisne department
