= Louis de Brienne de Conflans d'Armentières =

French general

Louis de Conflans, marquis d'Armentières (23 February 1711 – 18 January 1774) was a French general. He was promoted to lieutenant général in 1746 and was made a marshal of France in 1768.

== Family and origins ==
He was the son of Michel III de Conflans (1674–1717), marquis of Armentières, first gentleman of the chamber to the duc d'Orléans and of Diane Gabrielle de Jussac (1688–1777), lady of the palace to the duchesse de Berry, then dame de compagnie to the duchesse d'Orléans. He seems to have belonged to the house of Brienne, which had earlier included John of Brienne, king of Jerusalem and Latin Emperor of Constantinople. The de Conflans branch of the house originated with Engelbert III of Brienne and also included another marshal of France, Hubert de Brienne, comte de Conflans, appointed in 1758. Neither Louis nor any member of his family used the surname de Brienne. According to Saint-Simon's memoirs, Louis's branch of the family had fallen on hard times, but rose back into the upper circles of the court via Louis's father's and uncles's marriage to two daughters of Claude de Jussac, captain of the 'gardes de Monsieur', the regiment guarding the king's younger brother.

== Life ==
In 1717 he inherited the post of first gentleman of the chamber to the duc d'Orléans from his father, though Louis's uncles exercised the post in Louis's name. He joined the musketeers aged 15 in 1726 and was given command of the Anjou Infantry Regiment on 16 September 1727, aged 16.

During the War of the Polish Succession he served in Italy from 1733 to 1735. On 19 September 1734, he fought at Guastalla under the maréchal de Coigny and was wounded in the neck by a musket shot. On 18 October 1734 he became a brigadier, aged only 23. He served in the Bohemian expedition during the first phase of the War of the Austrian Succession, under maréchal de Belle-Isle. He returned to France in February 1743 and was made a maréchal de camp on 20 February that year. He then joined the armée d'Alsace during its campaign in Flanders. He fought at Rocourt on 11 October 1746 and brought Louis XV news of the victory. This gained him promotion to lieutenant général on the following 14 October. He continued serving in the war until 1748 and was appointed to the Order of the Holy Spirit on 1 January 1753.

During the Seven Years' War he initially served in Germany under marshals de Soubise and de Contades, before being put in command of the Trois Evêchés (Metz, Toul and Verdun) in 1761. He was made a marshal of France on 2 January 1768. On 18 January 1774 he died of apoplexy at Versailles in the cabinet du roi.

== Family ==
He married twice:

- On 15 May 1733, to Adélaïde Jeanne Françoise de Bouterou d'Aubigny (May 1717 - 9 May 1746), with whom he had three children:
  - Louis Gabriel, born 28 December 1735
  - Louis Charles, born 5 December 1737
  - Louise Gabrielle, born 3 November 1743
- In 1770, to Marie-Charlotte de Senneterre (14 November 1750 - 26 July 1794), granddaughter of Jean Charles de Saint-Nectaire, with whom he had one child :
  - Charles Louis Gabriel de Conflans, marquis d'Armentières (12 March 1772, Paris - 24 December 1849, Rœulx), who in 1790 married, Amélie Gabrielle Josephine, princess of Croy (1774–1847), daughter of Joseph Anne Maximilien de Croÿ d'Havré, with whom he had one child, Amélie Mélanie (18 June 1802, Brussels - 31 January 1833, Florence), who married Eugène (I) (1804†1880), 8th prince of Ligne.

== Bibliography ==
- Charles Gavard, Galeries historiques du Palais de Versailles, Imprimerie royale, 1842
