= Loupeigne =

- Commune
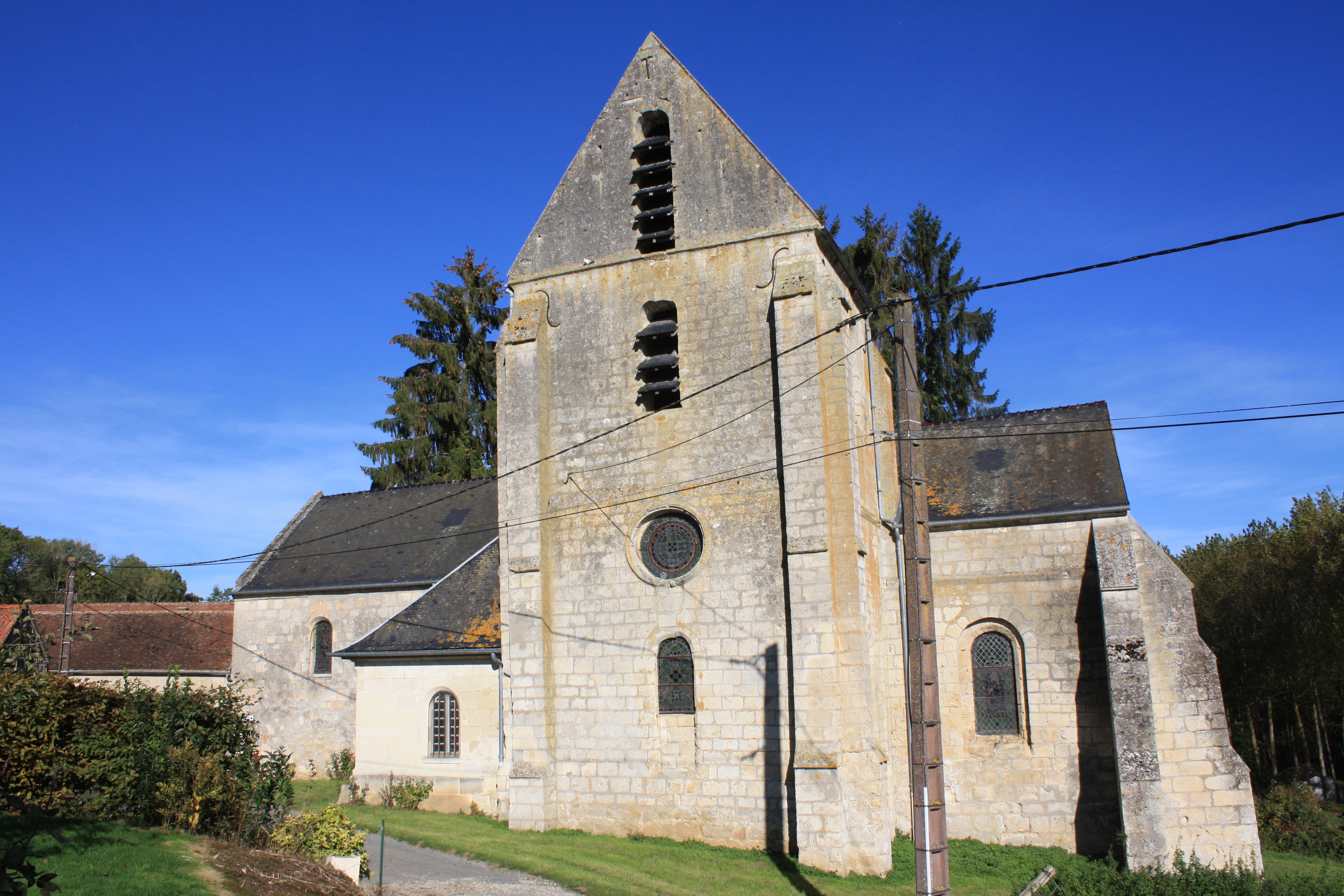
- The church of Loupeigne
- Location of Loupeigne
- Location within France Location within Hauts-de-France
- Coordinates: 49°14′52″N 3°32′09″E
- Country: France
- Region: Hauts-de-France
- Department: Aisne
- Arrondissement: Château-Thierry
- Canton: Fère-en-Tardenois
- Intercommunality: CA Région de Château-Thierry

Government
  - Mayor (2026–32): Didier Egloff
- Area^{1}: 7.3 km^{2} (2.8 sq mi)
- Elevation: 101 m (331 ft)
- Highest elevation: 140 m (460 ft)
- Lowest elevation: 79 m (259 ft)
- Population (2023): 85
  - Density: 12/km^{2} (30/sq mi)
- Time zone: UTC+01:00 (CET)
  - Summer (DST): UTC+02:00 (CEST)
- INSEE/Postal code: 02442 /02130
- ^{1} French Land Register data, which excludes lakes, ponds, glaciers > 1 km^{2} (0.386 sq mi or 247 acres) and river estuaries.

Loupeigne (French pronunciation: [lupɛɲ]) is a commune in the Aisne department in Hauts-de-France in northern France.

== Population ==
Historical population
Year	Pop.	±% p.a.
1968	125	—
1975	107	−2.20%
1982	109	+0.26%
1990	95	−1.70%
1999	77	−2.31%
2007	82	+0.79%
2012	85	+0.72%
2017	91	+1.37%
2023	85	−1.13%
Source: INSEE

== See also ==
- Communes of the Aisne department
