= Communauté d'agglomération de la Région de Château-Thierry =

Région de Château-Thierry
- Communauté d'agglomération
- Interactive map of Région de Château-Thierry
- Coordinates: 49°05′N 03°28′E
- Country: France
- Region: Hauts-de-France
- Department: Aisne
- No. of communes: {{{nbcomm}}}
- Established: 2017
- Area: 880.0 km^{2} (339.8 sq mi)
- Population (2019): 54,491
  - Density: 61.92/km^{2} (160.4/sq mi)
- Website: www.carct.fr

Communauté d'agglomération de la Région de Château-Thierry is the communauté d'agglomération, an intercommunal structure, centred on the town of Château-Thierry. It is located in the Aisne department, in the Hauts-de-France region, northern France. Created in 2017, its seat is in Étampes-sur-Marne. Its area is 880.0 km^{2}. Its population was 54,491 in 2019, of which 15,254 in Château-Thierry proper.

== Composition ==
The communauté d'agglomération consists of the following 87 communes:

1. Armentières-sur-Ourcq
2. Azy-sur-Marne
3. Barzy-sur-Marne
4. Belleau
5. Beuvardes
6. Bézu-Saint-Germain
7. Blesmes
8. Bonneil
9. Bonnesvalyn
10. Bouresches
11. Brasles
12. Brécy
13. Brumetz
14. Bruyères-sur-Fère
15. Bussiares
16. Celles-lès-Condé
17. Le Charmel
18. Chartèves
19. Château-Thierry
20. Chézy-en-Orxois
21. Chierry
22. Cierges
23. Coincy
24. Condé-en-Brie
25. Connigis
26. Coulonges-Cohan
27. Courboin
28. Courchamps
29. Courmont
30. Courtemont-Varennes
31. Crézancy
32. La Croix-sur-Ourcq
33. Dhuys-et-Morin-en-Brie
34. Dravegny
35. Épaux-Bézu
36. Épieds
37. Essômes-sur-Marne
38. Étampes-sur-Marne
39. Étrépilly
40. Fère-en-Tardenois
41. Fossoy
42. Fresnes-en-Tardenois
43. Gandelu
44. Gland
45. Goussancourt
46. Grisolles
47. Hautevesnes
48. Jaulgonne
49. Latilly
50. Licy-Clignon
51. Loupeigne
52. Mareuil-en-Dôle
53. Mézy-Moulins
54. Monthiers
55. Monthurel
56. Montigny-l'Allier
57. Montigny-lès-Condé
58. Montlevon
59. Mont-Saint-Père
60. Nanteuil-Notre-Dame
61. Nesles-la-Montagne
62. Neuilly-Saint-Front
63. Nogentel
64. Pargny-la-Dhuys
65. Passy-sur-Marne
66. Priez
67. Reuilly-Sauvigny
68. Rocourt-Saint-Martin
69. Ronchères
70. Rozet-Saint-Albin
71. Rozoy-Bellevalle
72. Saint-Eugène
73. Saint-Gengoulph
74. Saponay
75. Sergy
76. Seringes-et-Nesles
77. Sommelans
78. Torcy-en-Valois
79. Trélou-sur-Marne
80. Vallées en Champagne
81. Verdilly
82. Vézilly
83. Vichel-Nanteuil
84. Viffort
85. Villeneuve-sur-Fère
86. Villers-Agron-Aiguizy
87. Villers-sur-Fère
