= Ronchères, Aisne =

Ronchères
- Commune
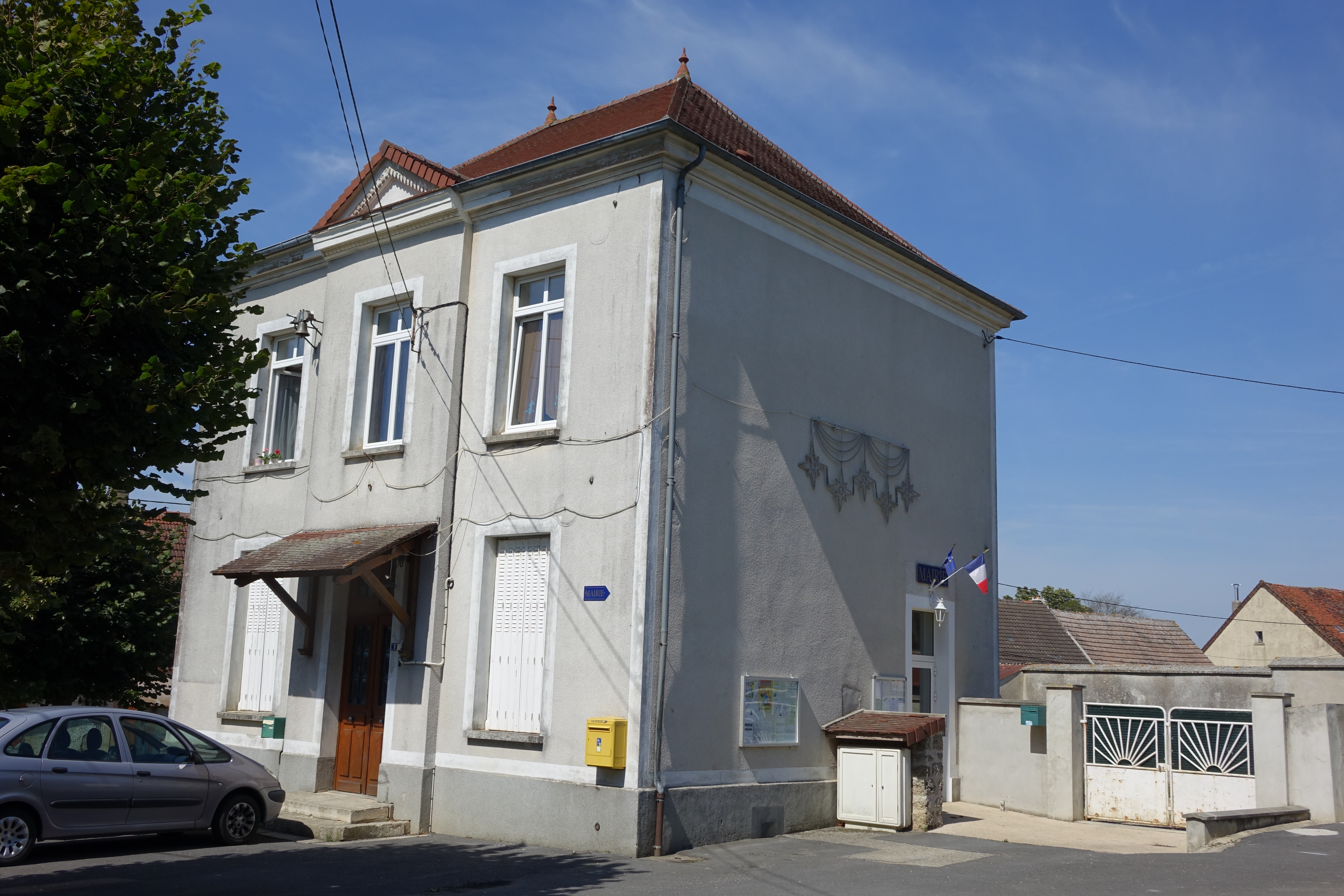
- The town hall of Ronchères
- Location of Ronchères
- Location within France Location within Hauts-de-France
- Coordinates: 49°08′42″N 3°36′10″E
- Country: France
- Region: Hauts-de-France
- Department: Aisne
- Arrondissement: Château-Thierry
- Canton: Fère-en-Tardenois
- Intercommunality: CA Région de Château-Thierry

Government
  - Mayor (2026–32): Bernard Douillard
- Area^{1}: 6.06 km^{2} (2.34 sq mi)
- Elevation: 231 m (758 ft)
- Highest elevation: 227 m (745 ft)
- Lowest elevation: 149 m (489 ft)
- Population (2023): 155
  - Density: 25.6/km^{2} (66.2/sq mi)
- Time zone: UTC+01:00 (CET)
  - Summer (DST): UTC+02:00 (CEST)
- INSEE/Postal code: 02655 /02130
- ^{1} French Land Register data, which excludes lakes, ponds, glaciers > 1 km^{2} (0.386 sq mi or 247 acres) and river estuaries.

Ronchères (French pronunciation: [ʁɔ̃ʃɛʁ]) is a commune in the Aisne department in Hauts-de-France in northern France.

== Population ==
Historical population
| Year | Pop. | ±% p.a. |
|---|---|---|
| 1968 | 112 | — |
| 1975 | 109 | −0.39% |
| 1982 | 114 | +0.64% |
| 1990 | 135 | +2.14% |
| 1999 | 111 | −2.15% |
| 2007 | 117 | +0.66% |
| 2012 | 134 | +2.75% |
| 2017 | 112 | −3.52% |
| 2023 | 155 | +5.56% |
Source: INSEE

== See also ==
- Communes of the Aisne department
