= Villers-sur-Fère =

- Commune
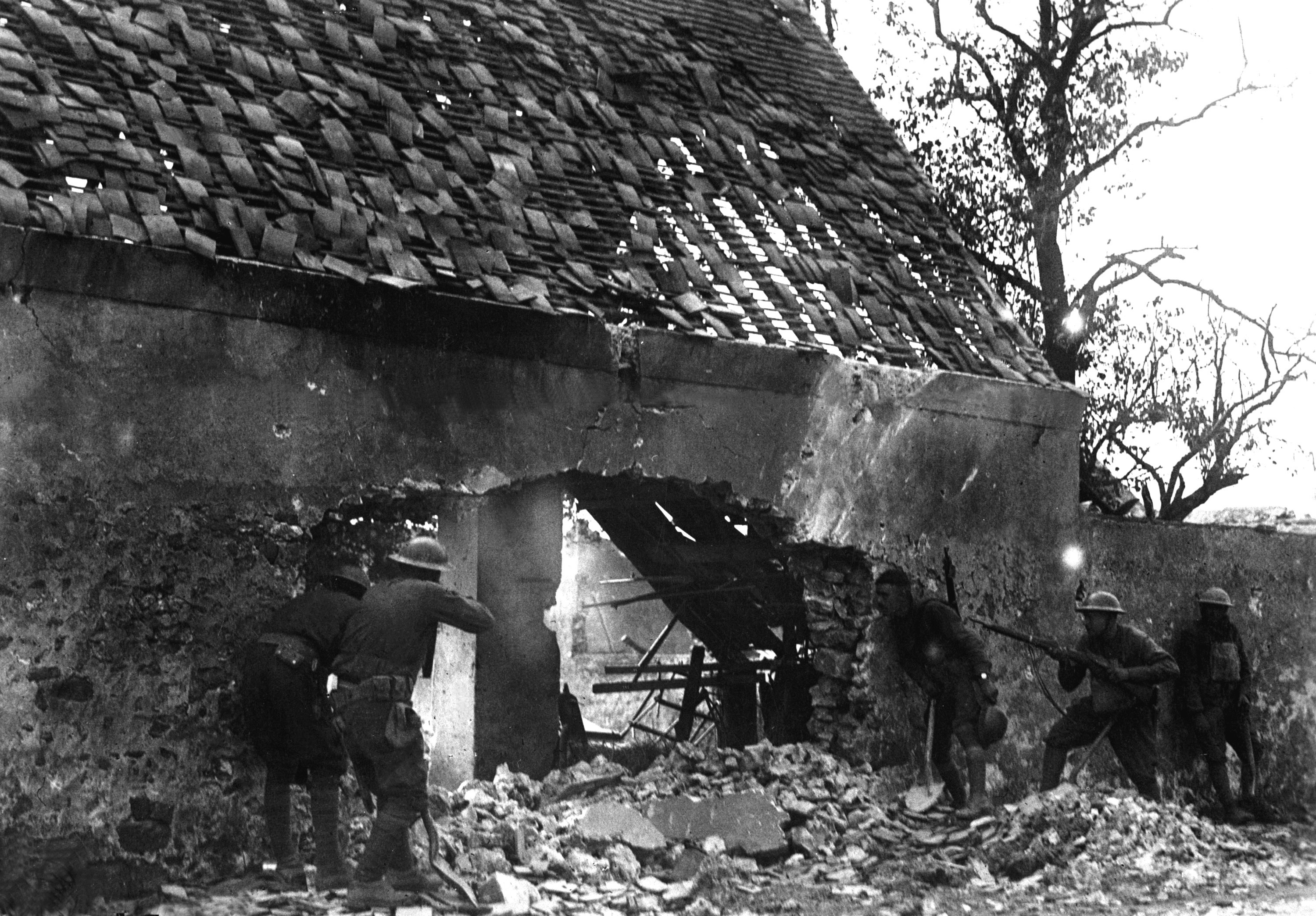
- 166th Infantry in action in Villers-sur-Fère in 1918
- Location of Villers-sur-Fère
- Location within France Location within Hauts-de-France
- Coordinates: 49°10′57″N 3°32′03″E
- Country: France
- Region: Hauts-de-France
- Department: Aisne
- Arrondissement: Château-Thierry
- Canton: Fère-en-Tardenois
- Intercommunality: CA Région de Château-Thierry

Government
  - Mayor (2026–32): Loïc Torchet
- Area^{1}: 10.79 km^{2} (4.17 sq mi)
- Elevation: 145 m (476 ft)
- Highest elevation: 214 m (702 ft)
- Lowest elevation: 115 m (377 ft)
- Population (2023): 508
  - Density: 47.1/km^{2} (122/sq mi)
- Time zone: UTC+01:00 (CET)
  - Summer (DST): UTC+02:00 (CEST)
- INSEE/Postal code: 02816 /02130
- ^{1} French Land Register data, which excludes lakes, ponds, glaciers > 1 km^{2} (0.386 sq mi or 247 acres) and river estuaries.

Villers-sur-Fère (French pronunciation: [vilɛʁ syʁ fɛʁ], literally Villers on Fère) is a commune in the Aisne department in Hauts-de-France in northern France.

== Population ==
Historical population
Year	Pop.	±% p.a.
1968	372	—
1975	309	−2.62%
1982	344	+1.54%
1990	458	+3.64%
1999	420	−0.96%
2007	453	+0.95%
2012	513	+2.52%
2017	527	+0.54%
2023	508	−0.61%
Source: INSEE

== See also ==
- Communes of the Aisne department
