= Vézilly =

- Commune
- Location of Vézilly
- Location within France Location within Hauts-de-France
- Coordinates: 49°10′54″N 3°41′31″E
- Country: France
- Region: Hauts-de-France
- Department: Aisne
- Arrondissement: Château-Thierry
- Canton: Fère-en-Tardenois
- Intercommunality: CA Région de Château-Thierry

Government
  - Mayor (2026–32): Armel Boutillier
- Area^{1}: 10.74 km^{2} (4.15 sq mi)
- Elevation: 249 m (817 ft)
- Highest elevation: 247 m (810 ft)
- Lowest elevation: 132 m (433 ft)
- Population (2023): 181
  - Density: 16.9/km^{2} (43.6/sq mi)
- Time zone: UTC+01:00 (CET)
  - Summer (DST): UTC+02:00 (CEST)
- INSEE/Postal code: 02794 /02130
- ^{1} French Land Register data, which excludes lakes, ponds, glaciers > 1 km^{2} (0.386 sq mi or 247 acres) and river estuaries.

Vézilly is a commune in the Aisne department in Hauts-de-France in northern France.

== Population ==
Historical population
Year	Pop.	±% p.a.
1968	131	—
1975	115	−1.84%
1982	112	−0.38%
1990	88	−2.97%
1999	124	+3.88%
2007	155	+2.83%
2012	193	+4.48%
2017	185	−0.84%
2023	181	−0.36%
Source: INSEE

== See also ==
- Communes of the Aisne department
