= Cierges =

- Commune
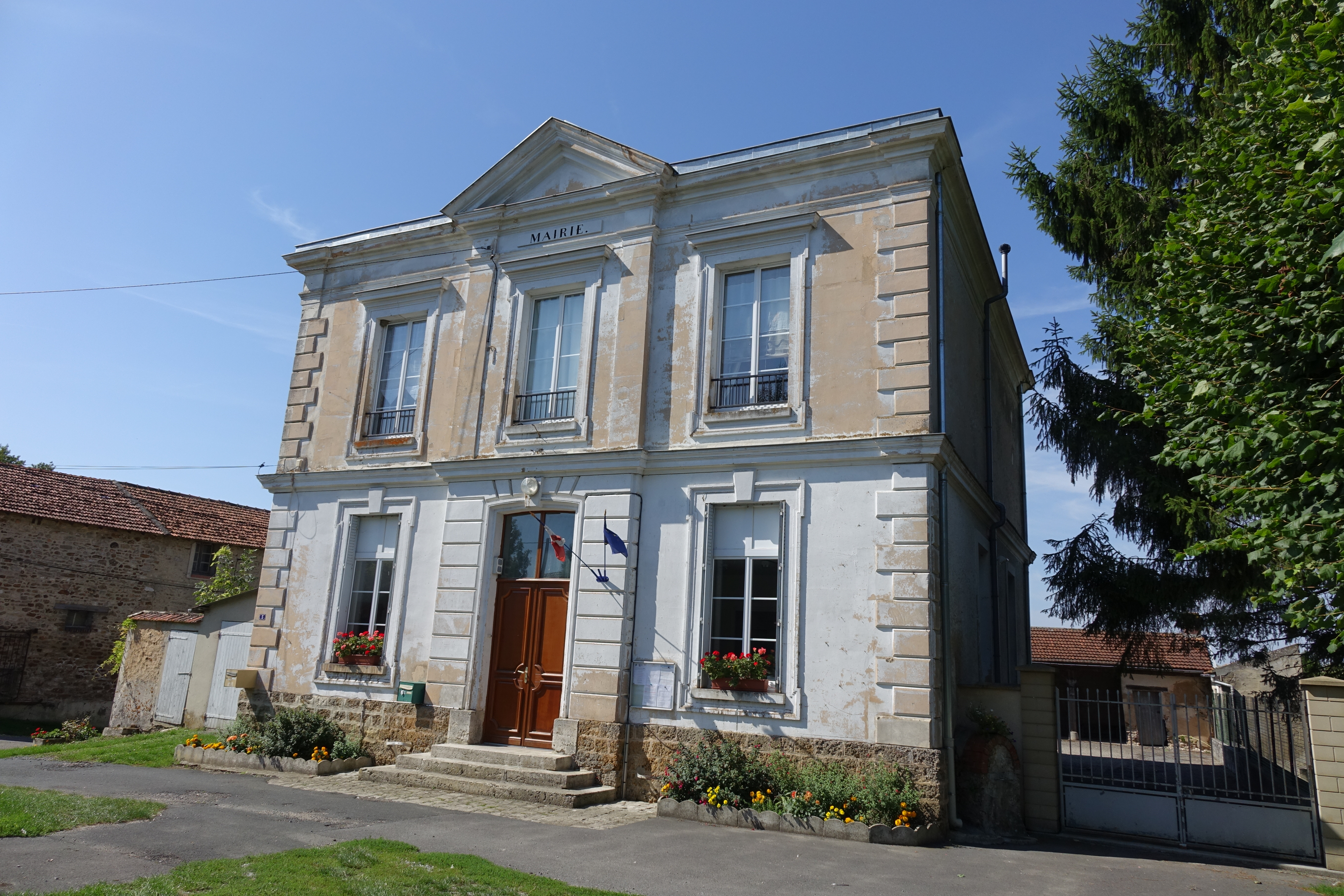
- The town hall of Cierges

- Coat of arms
- Location of Cierges
- Location within France Location within Hauts-de-France
- Coordinates: 49°10′07″N 3°35′58″E
- Country: France
- Region: Hauts-de-France
- Department: Aisne
- Arrondissement: Château-Thierry
- Canton: Fère-en-Tardenois
- Intercommunality: CA Région de Château-Thierry

Government
  - Mayor (2026–32): Jean-Marie Bérèche
- Area^{1}: 8.22 km^{2} (3.17 sq mi)
- Elevation: 170 m (560 ft)
- Highest elevation: 226 m (741 ft)
- Lowest elevation: 133 m (436 ft)
- Population (2023): 62
  - Density: 7.5/km^{2} (20/sq mi)
- Time zone: UTC+01:00 (CET)
  - Summer (DST): UTC+02:00 (CEST)
- INSEE/Postal code: 02193 /02130
- ^{1} French Land Register data, which excludes lakes, ponds, glaciers > 1 km^{2} (0.386 sq mi or 247 acres) and river estuaries.

Cierges (French pronunciation: [sjɛʁʒ]) is a commune in the Aisne department in Hauts-de-France in northern France.

== Population ==
Historical population
Year	Pop.	±% p.a.
1968	111	—
1975	121	+1.24%
1982	78	−6.08%
1990	81	+0.47%
1999	62	−2.93%
2007	74	+2.24%
2012	73	−0.27%
2017	66	−2.00%
2023	62	−1.04%
Source: INSEE

== See also ==
- Communes of the Aisne department
