= Étampes-sur-Marne =

- Commune
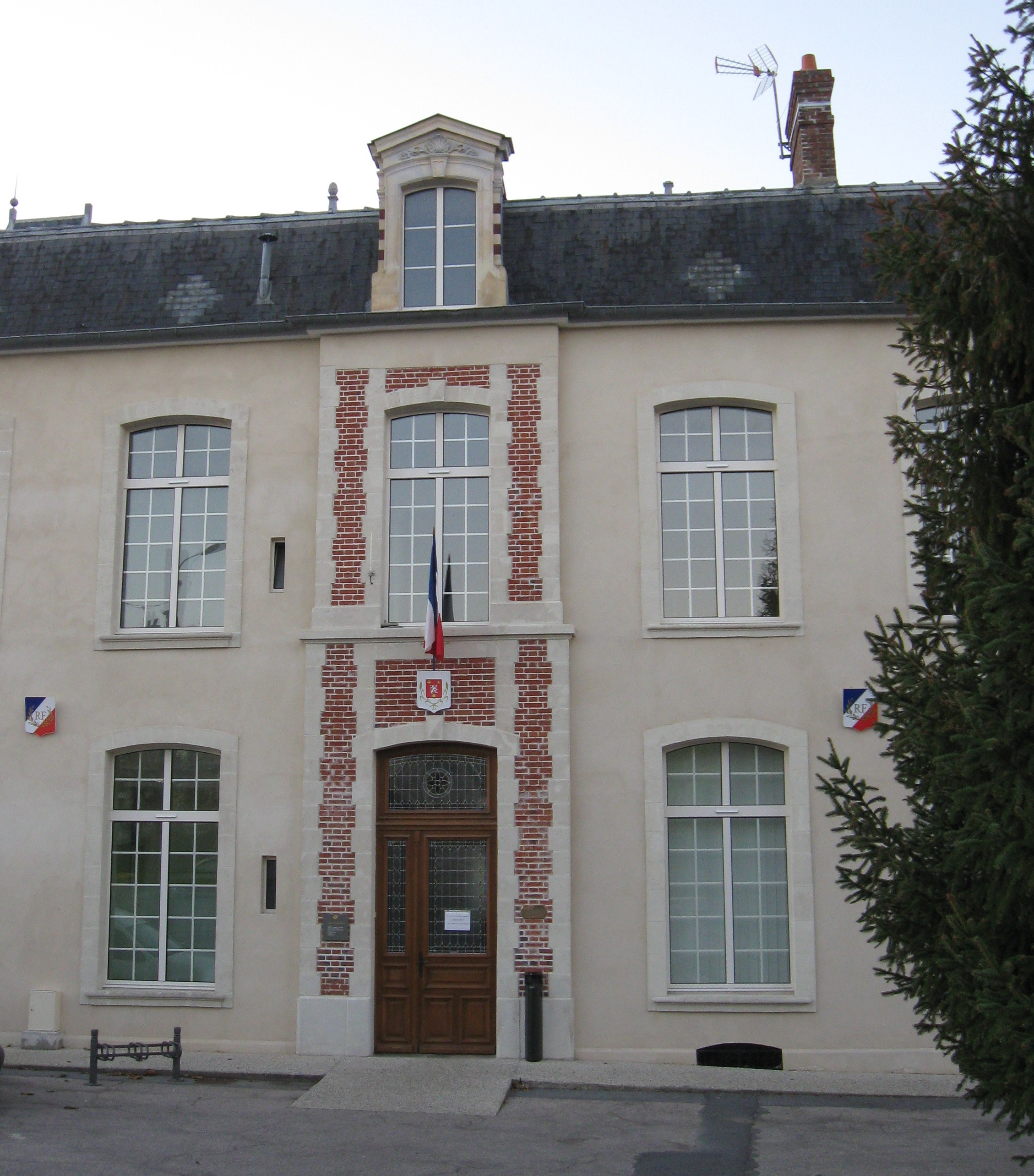
- The town hall of Étampes-sur-Marne

- Coat of arms
- Location of Étampes-sur-Marne
- Location within France Location within Hauts-de-France
- Coordinates: 49°02′06″N 3°25′12″E
- Country: France
- Region: Hauts-de-France
- Department: Aisne
- Arrondissement: Château-Thierry
- Canton: Château-Thierry
- Intercommunality: CA Région de Château-Thierry

Government
  - Mayor (2026–32): Jean-Luc Magnier
- Area^{1}: 2.24 km^{2} (0.86 sq mi)
- Elevation: 90 m (300 ft)
- Highest elevation: 213 m (699 ft)
- Lowest elevation: 59 m (194 ft)
- Population (2023): 1,329
  - Density: 593/km^{2} (1,540/sq mi)
- Time zone: UTC+01:00 (CET)
  - Summer (DST): UTC+02:00 (CEST)
- INSEE/Postal code: 02292 /02400
- ^{1} French Land Register data, which excludes lakes, ponds, glaciers > 1 km^{2} (0.386 sq mi or 247 acres) and river estuaries.

Étampes-sur-Marne (French pronunciation: [etɑ̃p syʁ maʁn], literally Étampes on Marne) is a commune in the Aisne department in Hauts-de-France in northern France. It lies adjacent to the south of the town Château-Thierry.

== Population ==
Historical population
Year	Pop.	±% p.a.
1968	1,363	—
1975	1,224	−1.52%
1982	1,246	+0.25%
1990	1,358	+1.08%
1999	1,313	−0.37%
2007	1,227	−0.84%
2012	1,134	−1.56%
2017	1,253	+2.02%
2023	1,329	+0.99%
Source: INSEE

== See also ==
- Communes of the Aisne department
