= Saponay =

- Commune
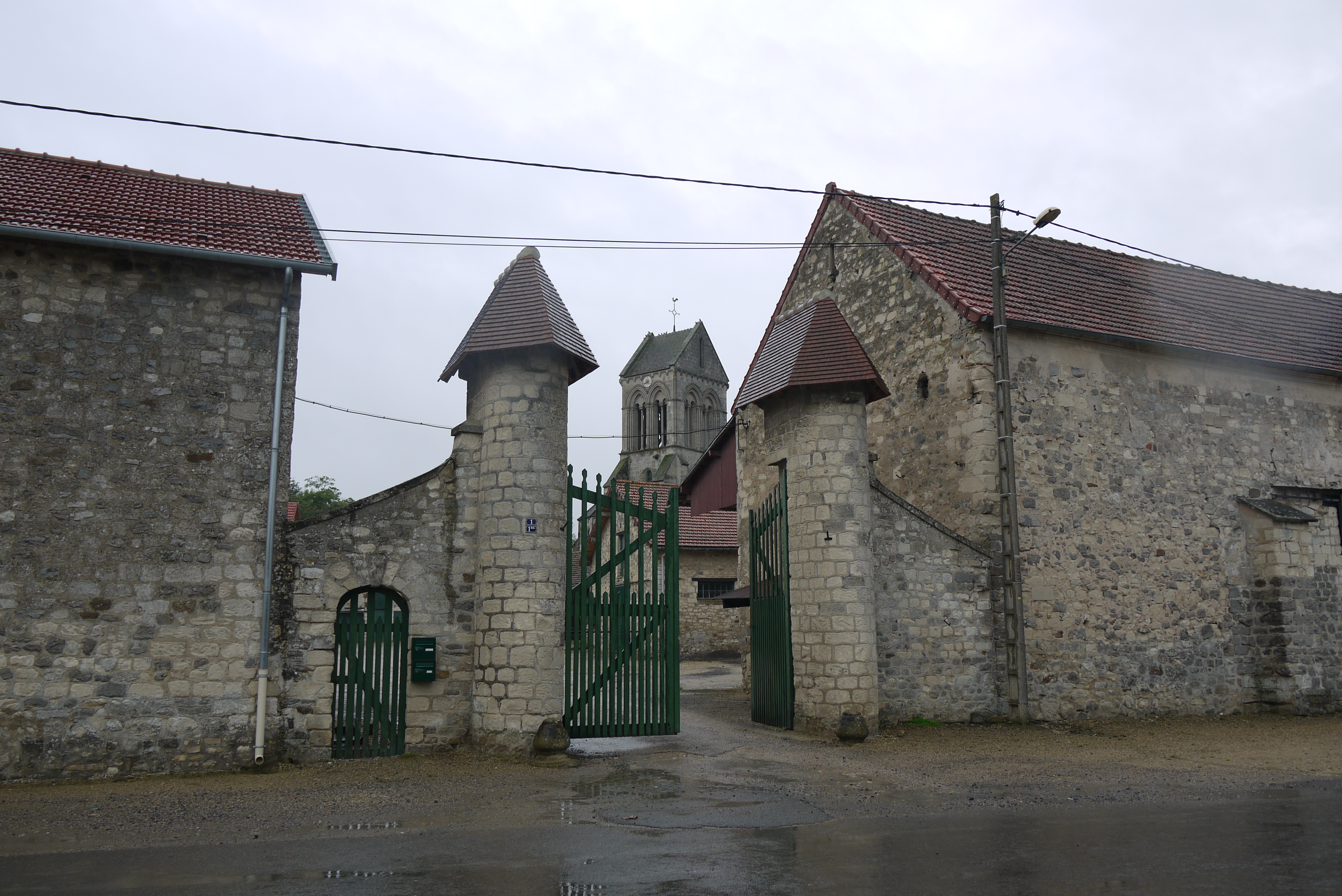
- The chateau of Saponay with the church in the background

- Coat of arms
- Location of Saponay
- Location within France Location within Hauts-de-France
- Coordinates: 49°12′53″N 3°28′50″E
- Country: France
- Region: Hauts-de-France
- Department: Aisne
- Arrondissement: Château-Thierry
- Canton: Fère-en-Tardenois
- Intercommunality: CA Région de Château-Thierry

Government
  - Mayor (2026–32): Anthony Petit
- Area^{1}: 9.93 km^{2} (3.83 sq mi)
- Elevation: 118 m (387 ft)
- Highest elevation: 176 m (577 ft)
- Lowest elevation: 97 m (318 ft)
- Population (2023): 266
  - Density: 26.8/km^{2} (69.4/sq mi)
- Time zone: UTC+01:00 (CET)
  - Summer (DST): UTC+02:00 (CEST)
- INSEE/Postal code: 02699 /02130
- ^{1} French Land Register data, which excludes lakes, ponds, glaciers > 1 km^{2} (0.386 sq mi or 247 acres) and river estuaries.

Saponay (French pronunciation: [sapɔnɛ]) is a commune in the Aisne department in Hauts-de-France in northern France.

== Population ==
Historical population
| Year | Pop. | ±% p.a. |
|---|---|---|
| 1968 | 252 | — |
| 1975 | 198 | −3.39% |
| 1982 | 187 | −0.81% |
| 1990 | 237 | +3.01% |
| 1999 | 246 | +0.41% |
| 2007 | 259 | +0.65% |
| 2012 | 263 | +0.31% |
| 2017 | 289 | +1.90% |
| 2023 | 266 | −1.37% |
Source: INSEE

== See also ==
- Communes of the Aisne department
