= Sergy, Aisne =

Sergy
- Commune
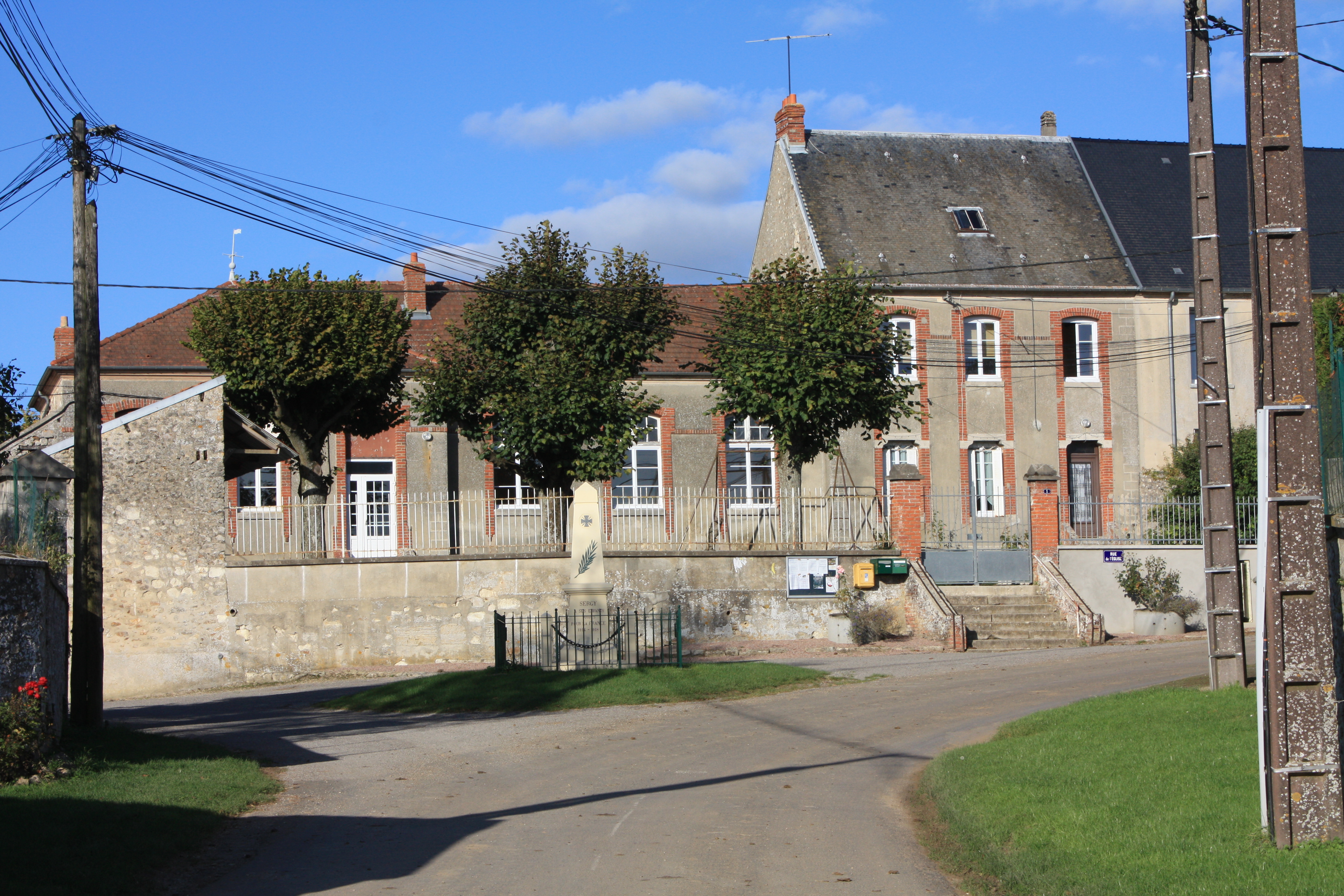
- A view within Sergy
- Location of Sergy
- Location within France Location within Hauts-de-France
- Coordinates: 49°11′00″N 3°34′15″E
- Country: France
- Region: Hauts-de-France
- Department: Aisne
- Arrondissement: Château-Thierry
- Canton: Fère-en-Tardenois
- Intercommunality: CA Région de Château-Thierry

Government
  - Mayor (2026–32): Patrick Poix
- Area^{1}: 13.32 km^{2} (5.14 sq mi)
- Elevation: 150 m (490 ft)
- Highest elevation: 217 m (712 ft)
- Lowest elevation: 122 m (400 ft)
- Population (2023): 139
  - Density: 10.4/km^{2} (27.0/sq mi)
- Time zone: UTC+01:00 (CET)
  - Summer (DST): UTC+02:00 (CEST)
- INSEE/Postal code: 02712 /02130
- ^{1} French Land Register data, which excludes lakes, ponds, glaciers > 1 km^{2} (0.386 sq mi or 247 acres) and river estuaries.

Sergy (French pronunciation: [sɛʁʒi]) is a commune in the Aisne department in Hauts-de-France in northern France.

== Population ==
Historical population
Year	Pop.	±% p.a.
1968	142	—
1975	141	−0.10%
1982	125	−1.71%
1990	134	+0.87%
1999	143	+0.72%
2007	158	+1.25%
2012	162	+0.50%
2017	151	−1.40%
2023	139	−1.37%
Source: INSEE

== See also ==
- Communes of the Aisne department
