= Bonneil =

- Commune
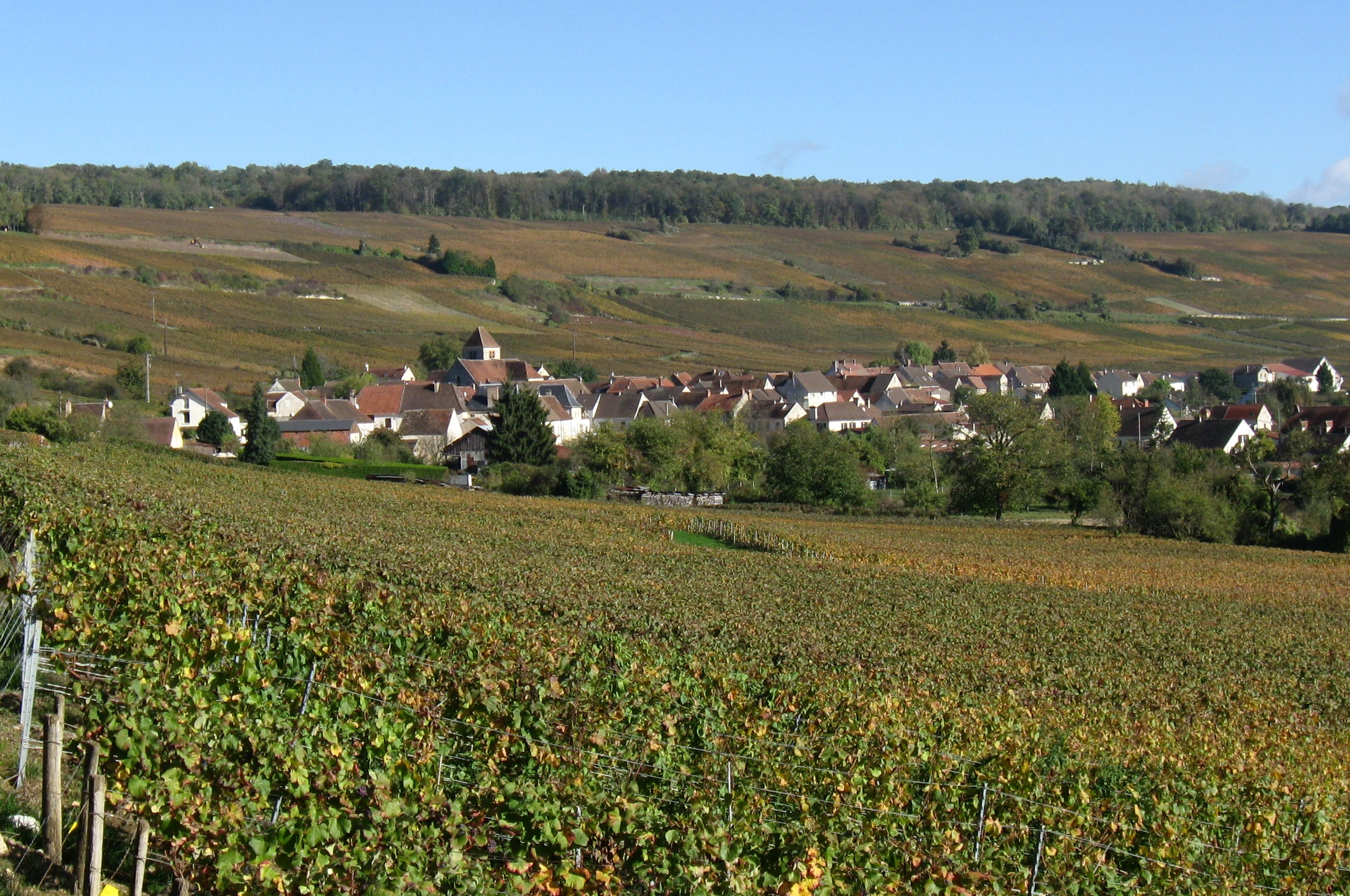
- A general view of Bonneil
- Location of Bonneil
- Location within France Location within Hauts-de-France
- Coordinates: 49°00′30″N 3°20′58″E
- Country: France
- Region: Hauts-de-France
- Department: Aisne
- Arrondissement: Château-Thierry
- Canton: Essômes-sur-Marne
- Intercommunality: CA Région de Château-Thierry

Government
  - Mayor (2026–32): Stéphanie Boucant
- Area^{1}: 2.11 km^{2} (0.81 sq mi)
- Elevation: 70 m (230 ft)
- Highest elevation: 201 m (659 ft)
- Lowest elevation: 58 m (190 ft)
- Population (2023): 375
  - Density: 178/km^{2} (460/sq mi)
- Time zone: UTC+01:00 (CET)
  - Summer (DST): UTC+02:00 (CEST)
- INSEE/Postal code: 02098 /02400
- ^{1} French Land Register data, which excludes lakes, ponds, glaciers > 1 km^{2} (0.386 sq mi or 247 acres) and river estuaries.

Bonneil (French pronunciation: [bɔnɛj]) is a commune in the department of Aisne in Hauts-de-France in northern France.

== Population ==
Historical population
Year	Pop.	±% p.a.
1968	259	—
1975	255	−0.22%
1982	287	+1.70%
1990	336	+1.99%
1999	374	+1.20%
2007	407	+1.06%
2012	390	−0.85%
2017	375	−0.78%
2023	375	+0.00%
Source: INSEE

== See also ==
- Communes of the Aisne department
