= Neuilly-Saint-Front =

- Commune
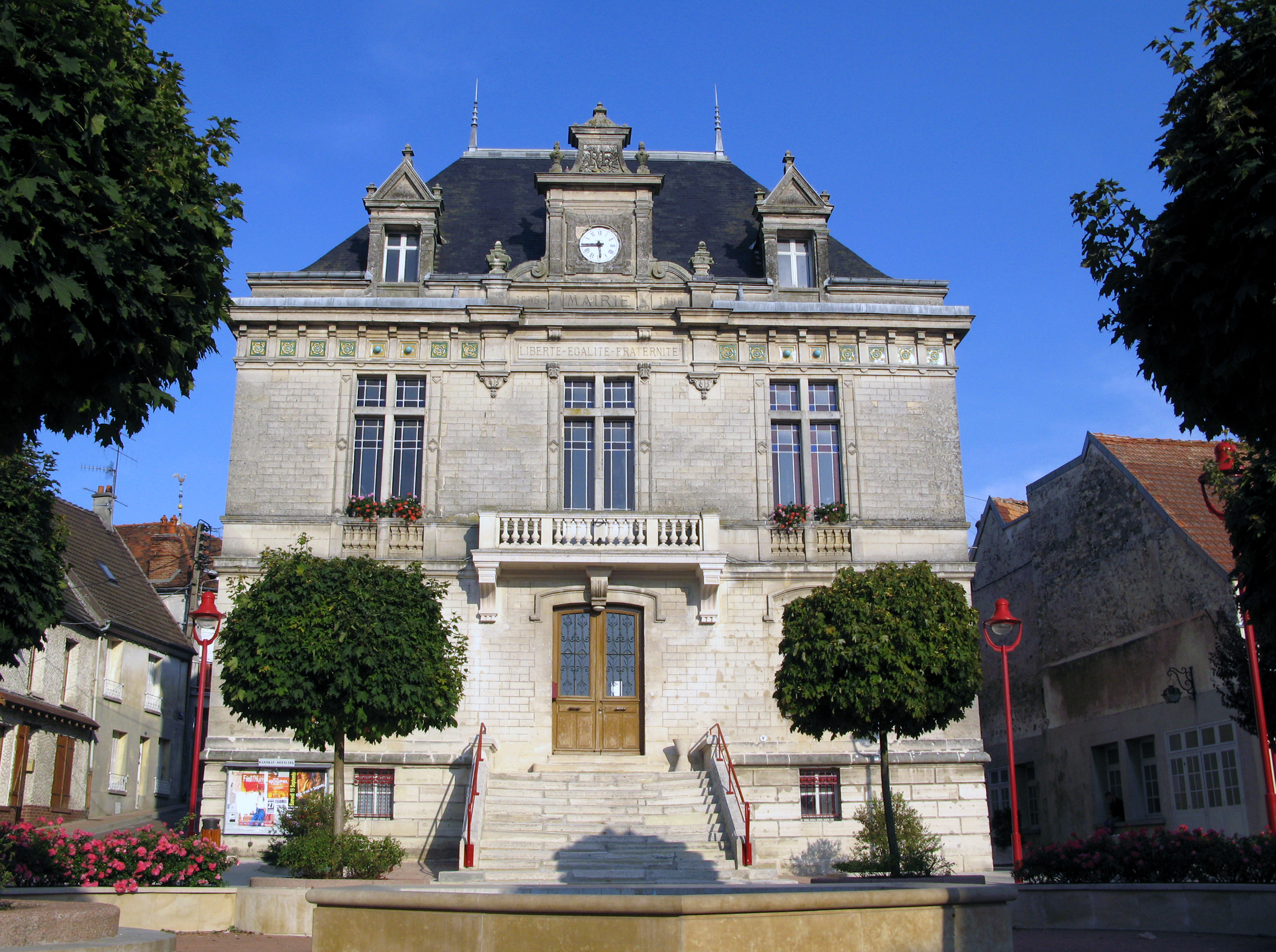
- Town hall

- Coat of arms
- Location of Neuilly-Saint-Front
- Location within France Location within Hauts-de-France
- Coordinates: 49°10′09″N 3°15′53″E
- Country: France
- Region: Hauts-de-France
- Department: Aisne
- Arrondissement: Château-Thierry
- Canton: Villers-Cotterêts
- Intercommunality: CA Région de Château-Thierry

Government
  - Mayor (2026–32): Ludovic Houée
- Area^{1}: 17.89 km^{2} (6.91 sq mi)
- Elevation: 80 m (260 ft)
- Highest elevation: 181 m (594 ft)
- Lowest elevation: 72 m (236 ft)
- Population (2023): 1,943
  - Density: 108.6/km^{2} (281.3/sq mi)
- Time zone: UTC+01:00 (CET)
  - Summer (DST): UTC+02:00 (CEST)
- INSEE/Postal code: 02543 /02470
- ^{1} French Land Register data, which excludes lakes, ponds, glaciers > 1 km^{2} (0.386 sq mi or 247 acres) and river estuaries.

Neuilly-Saint-Front (French pronunciation: [nøji sɛ̃ fʁɔ̃]) is a commune in the Aisne department in Hauts-de-France in northern France.

== Population ==
Historical population
Year	Pop.	±% p.a.
1968	1,653	—
1975	1,705	+0.44%
1982	1,847	+1.15%
1990	1,993	+0.96%
1999	2,088	+0.52%
2007	2,128	+0.24%
2012	2,158	+0.28%
2017	2,078	−0.75%
2023	1,943	−1.11%
Source: INSEE

== See also ==
- Communes of the Aisne department
