= Rozet-Saint-Albin =

- Commune
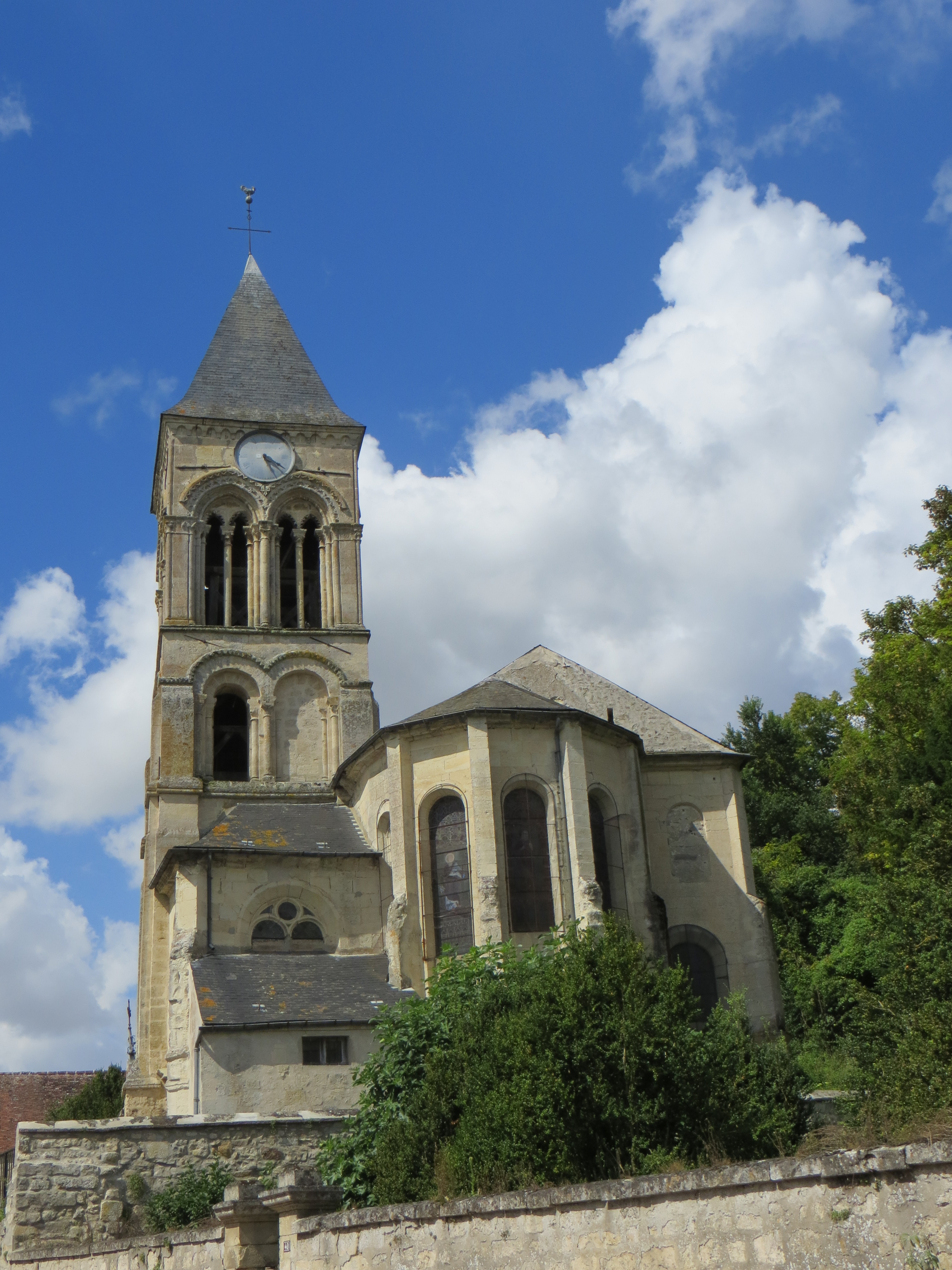
- The church of Rozet-Saint-Albin
- Location of Rozet-Saint-Albin
- Location within France Location within Hauts-de-France
- Coordinates: 49°11′41″N 3°17′56″E
- Country: France
- Region: Hauts-de-France
- Department: Aisne
- Arrondissement: Château-Thierry
- Canton: Villers-Cotterêts
- Intercommunality: CA Région de Château-Thierry

Government
  - Mayor (2026–32): Antoine Viet
- Area^{1}: 7.95 km^{2} (3.07 sq mi)
- Elevation: 83 m (272 ft)
- Highest elevation: 184 m (604 ft)
- Lowest elevation: 75 m (246 ft)
- Population (2023): 335
  - Density: 42.1/km^{2} (109/sq mi)
- Time zone: UTC+01:00 (CET)
  - Summer (DST): UTC+02:00 (CEST)
- INSEE/Postal code: 02662 /02210
- ^{1} French Land Register data, which excludes lakes, ponds, glaciers > 1 km^{2} (0.386 sq mi or 247 acres) and river estuaries.

Rozet-Saint-Albin is a commune in the Aisne department in Hauts-de-France in northern France.

== Population ==
Historical population
Year	Pop.	±% p.a.
1968	273	—
1975	272	−0.05%
1982	240	−1.77%
1990	276	+1.76%
1999	292	+0.63%
2007	307	+0.63%
2012	279	−1.89%
2017	309	+2.06%
2023	335	+1.36%
Source: INSEE

== See also ==
- Communes of the Aisne department
