= Latilly =

- Commune
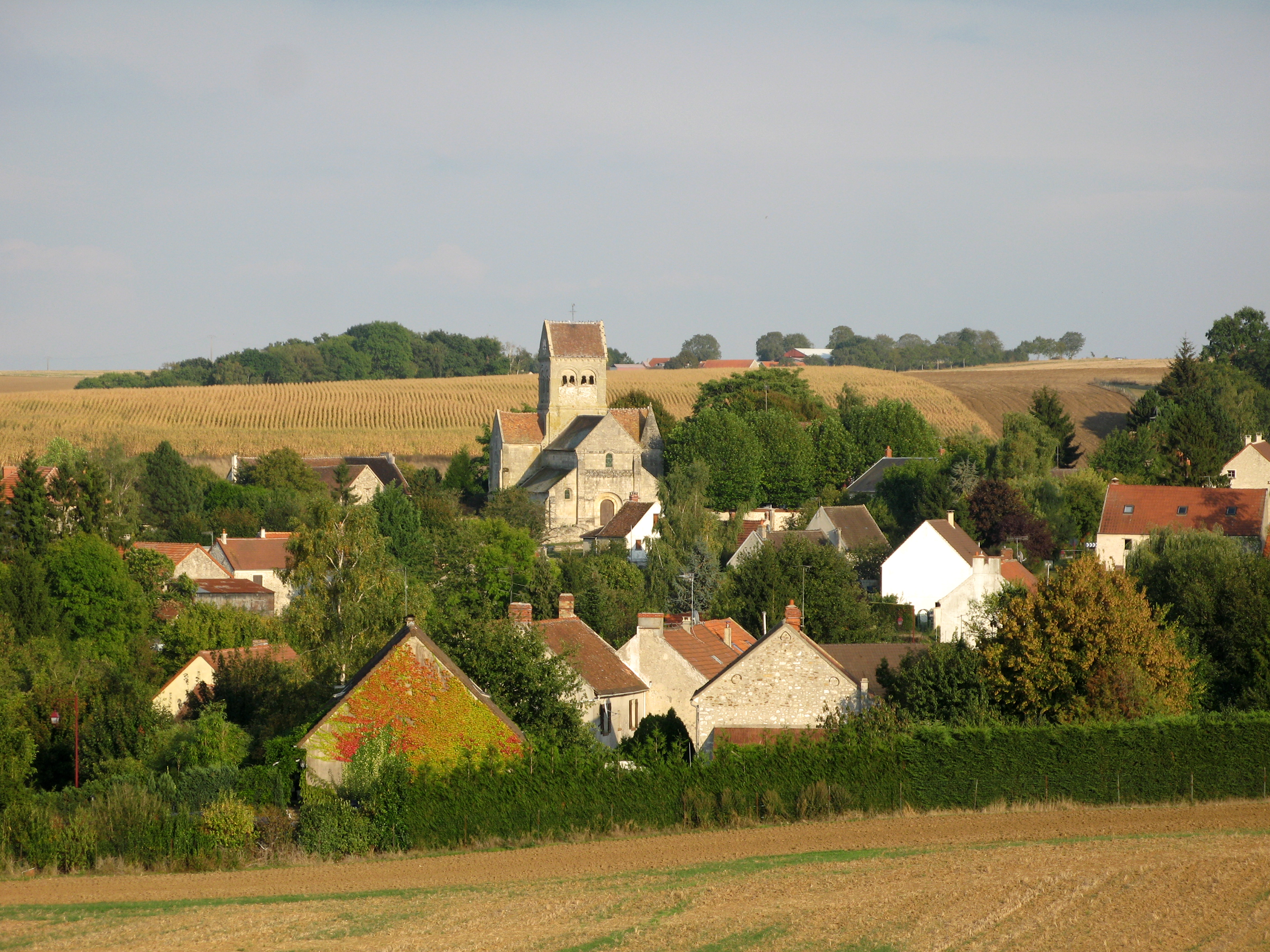
- A general view of Latilly
- Location of Latilly
- Location within France Location within Hauts-de-France
- Coordinates: 49°09′18″N 3°18′40″E
- Country: France
- Region: Hauts-de-France
- Department: Aisne
- Arrondissement: Château-Thierry
- Canton: Villers-Cotterêts
- Intercommunality: CA Région de Château-Thierry

Government
  - Mayor (2026–32): Claude Menu
- Area^{1}: 9.32 km^{2} (3.60 sq mi)
- Elevation: 137 m (449 ft)
- Highest elevation: 201 m (659 ft)
- Lowest elevation: 99 m (325 ft)
- Population (2023): 198
  - Density: 21.2/km^{2} (55.0/sq mi)
- Time zone: UTC+01:00 (CET)
  - Summer (DST): UTC+02:00 (CEST)
- INSEE/Postal code: 02411 /02210
- ^{1} French Land Register data, which excludes lakes, ponds, glaciers > 1 km^{2} (0.386 sq mi or 247 acres) and river estuaries.

Latilly is a commune in the Aisne department in Hauts-de-France in northern France.

== Demographics ==
Historical population
Year	Pop.	±% p.a.
1968	186	—
1975	145	−3.49%
1982	135	−1.02%
1990	179	+3.59%
1999	179	+0.00%
2007	222	+2.73%
2012	210	−1.11%
2017	208	−0.19%
2023	198	−0.82%
Source: INSEE

== See also ==
- Communes of the Aisne department
