= Nanteuil-Notre-Dame =

- Commune
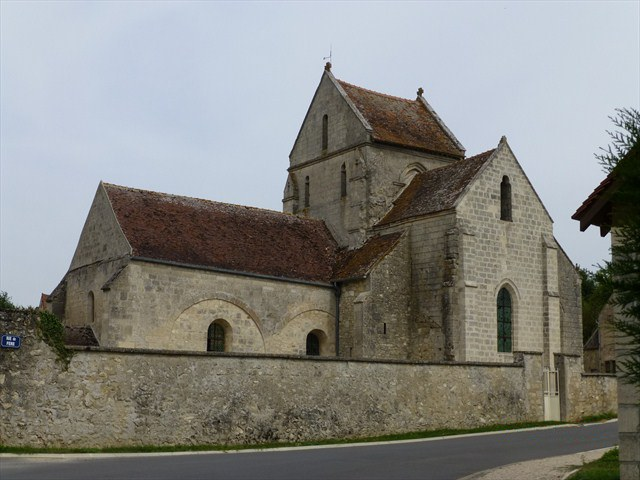
- The church of Nanteuil-Notre-Dame
- Location of Nanteuil-Notre-Dame
- Location within France Location within Hauts-de-France
- Coordinates: 49°11′34″N 3°24′34″E
- Country: France
- Region: Hauts-de-France
- Department: Aisne
- Arrondissement: Château-Thierry
- Canton: Fère-en-Tardenois
- Intercommunality: CA Région de Château-Thierry

Government
  - Mayor (2026–32): Didier Foulon
- Area^{1}: 3.72 km^{2} (1.44 sq mi)
- Elevation: 92 m (302 ft)
- Highest elevation: 129 m (423 ft)
- Lowest elevation: 87 m (285 ft)
- Population (2023): 86
  - Density: 23/km^{2} (60/sq mi)
- Time zone: UTC+01:00 (CET)
  - Summer (DST): UTC+02:00 (CEST)
- INSEE/Postal code: 02538 /02210
- ^{1} French Land Register data, which excludes lakes, ponds, glaciers > 1 km^{2} (0.386 sq mi or 247 acres) and river estuaries.

Nanteuil-Notre-Dame (French pronunciation: [nɑ̃tœj nɔtʁ dam]) is a commune in the Aisne department in Hauts-de-France in northern France.

== Population ==
Historical population
Year	Pop.	±% p.a.
1968	71	—
1975	65	−1.25%
1982	51	−3.41%
1990	76	+5.11%
1999	76	+0.00%
2007	71	−0.85%
2012	63	−2.36%
2017	62	−0.32%
2023	86	+5.60%
Source: INSEE

== See also ==
- Communes of the Aisne department
