= Veuilly-la-Poterie =

- Commune
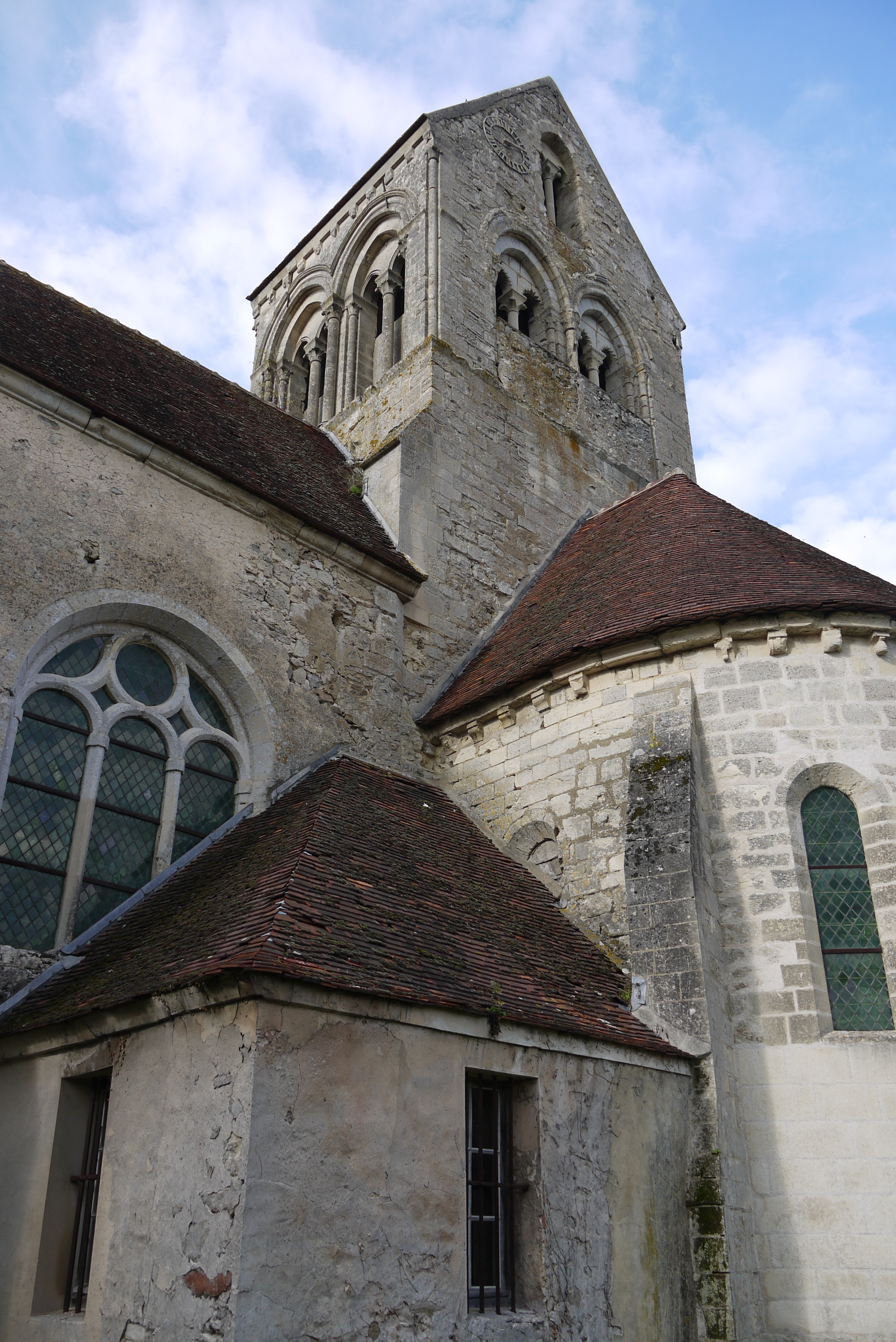
- The church of Veuilly-la-Poterie

- Coat of arms
- Location of Veuilly-la-Poterie
- Location within France Location within Hauts-de-France
- Coordinates: 49°05′09″N 3°12′46″E
- Country: France
- Region: Hauts-de-France
- Department: Aisne
- Arrondissement: Château-Thierry
- Canton: Essômes-sur-Marne
- Intercommunality: Charly sur Marne

Government
  - Mayor (2026–32): Fabien Caux
- Area^{1}: 7.54 km^{2} (2.91 sq mi)
- Elevation: 152 m (499 ft)
- Highest elevation: 176 m (577 ft)
- Lowest elevation: 72 m (236 ft)
- Population (2023): 155
  - Density: 20.6/km^{2} (53.2/sq mi)
- Time zone: UTC+01:00 (CET)
  - Summer (DST): UTC+02:00 (CEST)
- INSEE/Postal code: 02792 /02810
- ^{1} French Land Register data, which excludes lakes, ponds, glaciers > 1 km^{2} (0.386 sq mi or 247 acres) and river estuaries.

Veuilly-la-Poterie (French pronunciation: [vœji la pɔtʁi]) is a commune in the Aisne department in Hauts-de-France in northern France.

== Population ==
Historical population
Year	Pop.	±% p.a.
1968	131	—
1975	122	−1.01%
1982	116	−0.72%
1990	107	−1.00%
1999	127	+1.92%
2007	135	+0.77%
2012	143	+1.16%
2017	155	+1.62%
2023	155	+0.00%
Source: INSEE

== See also ==
- Communes of the Aisne department
