= Vichel-Nanteuil =

- Commune
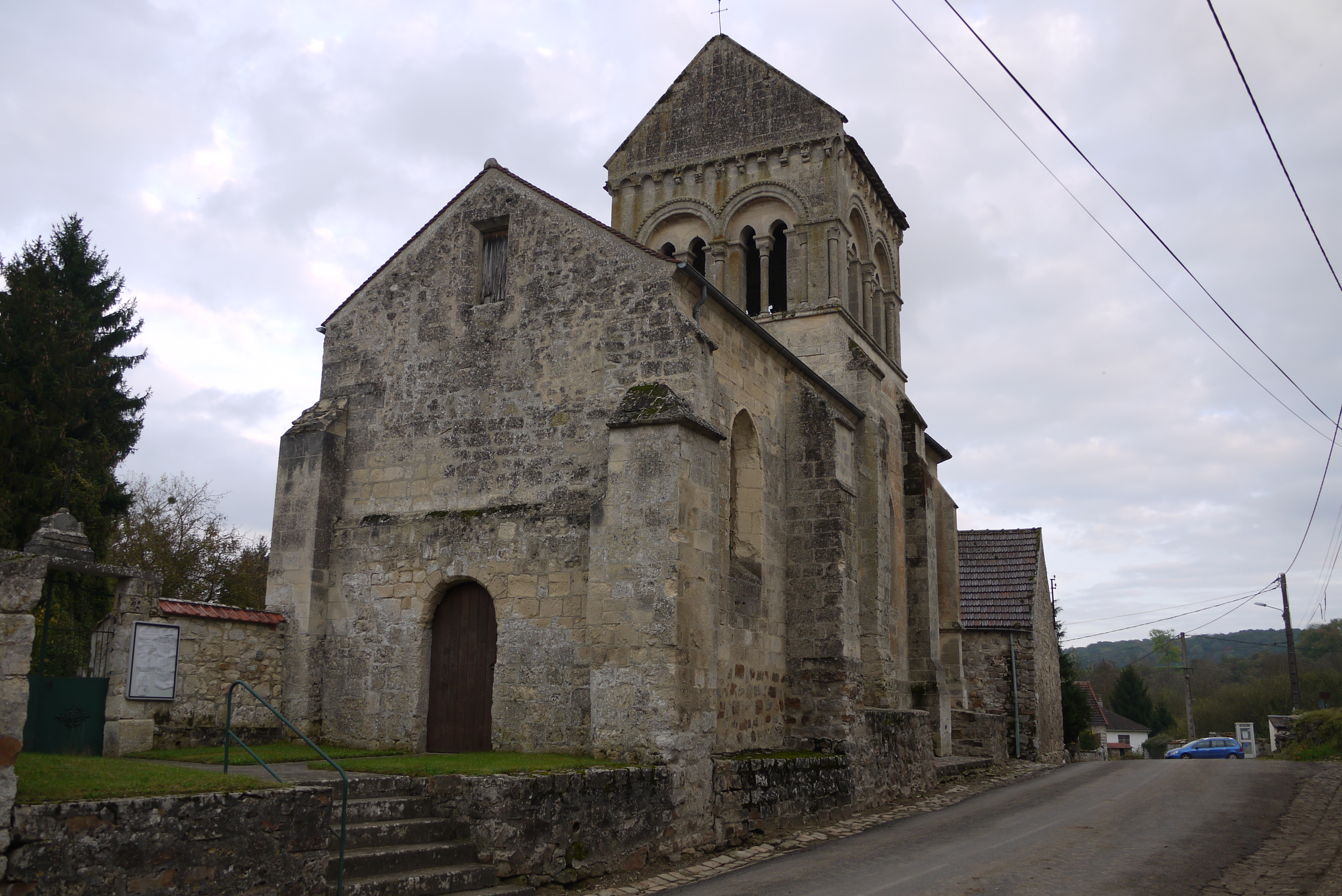
- The church of Vichel
- Location of Vichel-Nanteuil
- Location within France Location within Hauts-de-France
- Coordinates: 49°11′18″N 3°17′25″E
- Country: France
- Region: Hauts-de-France
- Department: Aisne
- Arrondissement: Château-Thierry
- Canton: Villers-Cotterêts
- Intercommunality: CA Région de Château-Thierry

Government
  - Mayor (2026–32): Marie-Odile Larché
- Area^{1}: 6.39 km^{2} (2.47 sq mi)
- Elevation: 83 m (272 ft)
- Highest elevation: 173 m (568 ft)
- Lowest elevation: 77 m (253 ft)
- Population (2023): 93
  - Density: 15/km^{2} (38/sq mi)
- Time zone: UTC+01:00 (CET)
  - Summer (DST): UTC+02:00 (CEST)
- INSEE/Postal code: 02796 /02210
- ^{1} French Land Register data, which excludes lakes, ponds, glaciers > 1 km^{2} (0.386 sq mi or 247 acres) and river estuaries.

Vichel-Nanteuil is a commune in the Aisne department in Hauts-de-France in northern France.

== Population ==
Historical population
Year	Pop.	±% p.a.
1968	122	—
1975	96	−3.37%
1982	67	−5.01%
1990	88	+3.47%
1999	86	−0.26%
2007	98	+1.65%
2012	89	−1.91%
2017	87	−0.45%
2023	93	+1.12%
Source: INSEE

== See also ==
- Communes of the Aisne department
