= Hautevesnes =

- Commune
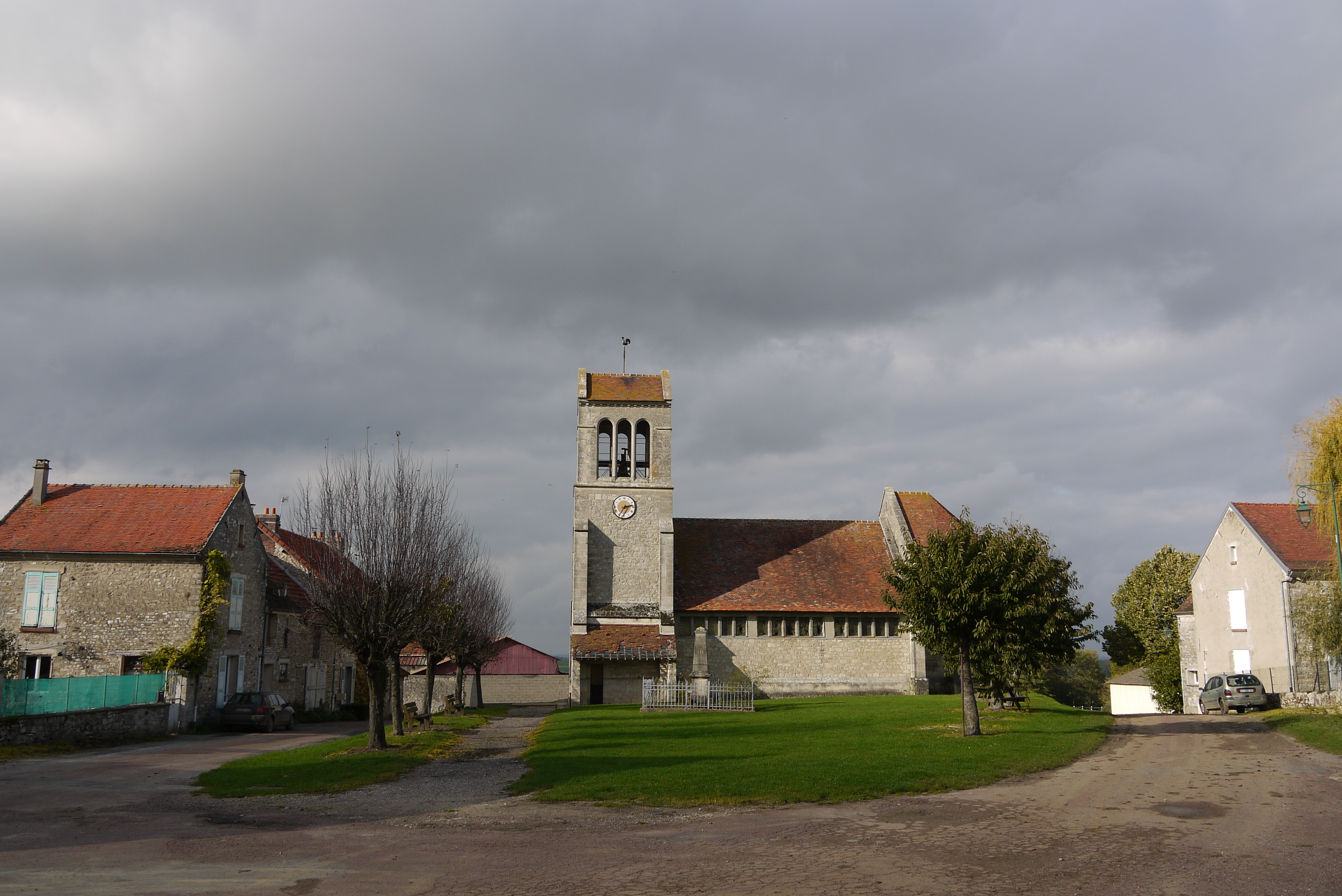
- The church of Hautevesnes

- Coat of arms
- Location of Hautevesnes
- Location within France Location within Hauts-de-France
- Coordinates: 49°06′36″N 3°13′59″E
- Country: France
- Region: Hauts-de-France
- Department: Aisne
- Arrondissement: Château-Thierry
- Canton: Villers-Cotterêts
- Intercommunality: CA Région de Château-Thierry

Government
  - Mayor (2026–32): Patrice Lazaro
- Area^{1}: 7.29 km^{2} (2.81 sq mi)
- Elevation: 173 m (568 ft)
- Highest elevation: 173 m (568 ft)
- Lowest elevation: 78 m (256 ft)
- Population (2023): 165
  - Density: 22.6/km^{2} (58.6/sq mi)
- Time zone: UTC+01:00 (CET)
  - Summer (DST): UTC+02:00 (CEST)
- INSEE/Postal code: 02375 /02810
- ^{1} French Land Register data, which excludes lakes, ponds, glaciers > 1 km^{2} (0.386 sq mi or 247 acres) and river estuaries.

Hautevesnes (French pronunciation: [otvɛn]) is a commune in the Aisne department in Hauts-de-France in northern France.

== Population ==
Historical population
Year	Pop.	±% p.a.
1968	119	—
1975	94	−3.31%
1982	105	+1.59%
1990	102	−0.36%
1999	146	+4.07%
2007	133	−1.16%
2012	162	+4.02%
2017	167	+0.61%
2023	165	−0.20%
Source: INSEE

== See also ==
- Communes of the Aisne department
