= Battle of the Marne =

There were two battles of the Marne, taking place near the Marne River in Marne, France during World War I:

- First Battle of the Marne (1914)
- Second Battle of the Marne (1918)
