= Essômes-sur-Marne =

- Commune
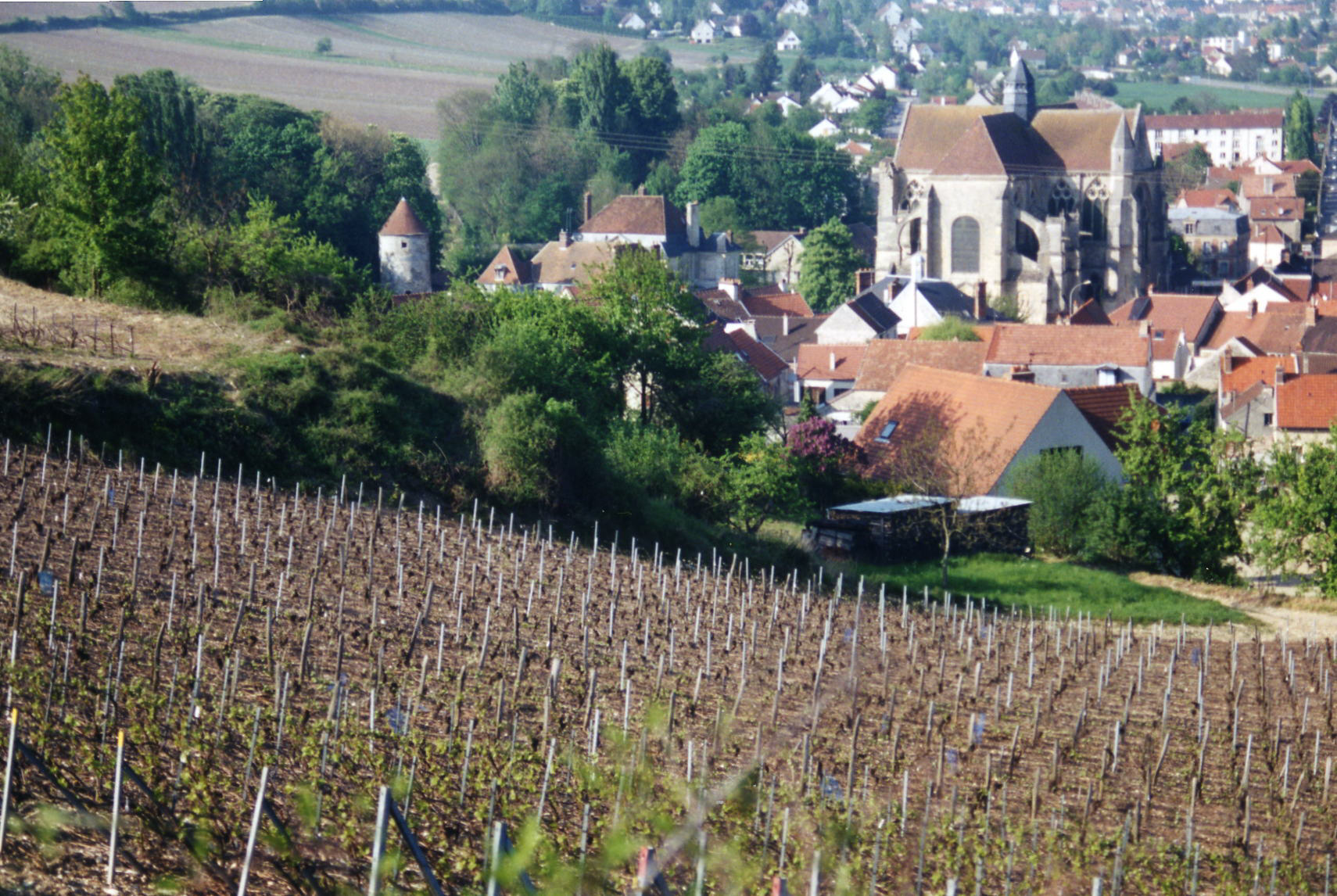
- A general view of Essômes-sur-Marne

- Coat of arms
- Location of Essômes-sur-Marne
- Location within France Location within Hauts-de-France
- Coordinates: 49°01′49″N 3°22′30″E
- Country: France
- Region: Hauts-de-France
- Department: Aisne
- Arrondissement: Château-Thierry
- Canton: Essômes-sur-Marne
- Intercommunality: CA Région de Château-Thierry

Government
  - Mayor (2026–32): Jean-Paul Bergault
- Area^{1}: 28.55 km^{2} (11.02 sq mi)
- Elevation: 72 m (236 ft)
- Highest elevation: 216 m (709 ft)
- Lowest elevation: 58 m (190 ft)
- Population (2023): 2,691
  - Density: 94.26/km^{2} (244.1/sq mi)
- Time zone: UTC+01:00 (CET)
  - Summer (DST): UTC+02:00 (CEST)
- INSEE/Postal code: 02290 /02400
- ^{1} French Land Register data, which excludes lakes, ponds, glaciers > 1 km^{2} (0.386 sq mi or 247 acres) and river estuaries.

Essômes-sur-Marne (French pronunciation: [ɛsom syʁ maʁn], literally Essômes on Marne) is a commune in the Aisne department in Hauts-de-France in northern France.

== Population ==
Historical population
Year	Pop.	±% p.a.
1968	2,055	—
1975	2,038	−0.12%
1982	2,321	+1.87%
1990	2,479	+0.83%
1999	2,486	+0.03%
2007	2,528	+0.21%
2012	2,758	+1.76%
2017	2,776	+0.13%
2023	2,691	−0.52%
Source: INSEE

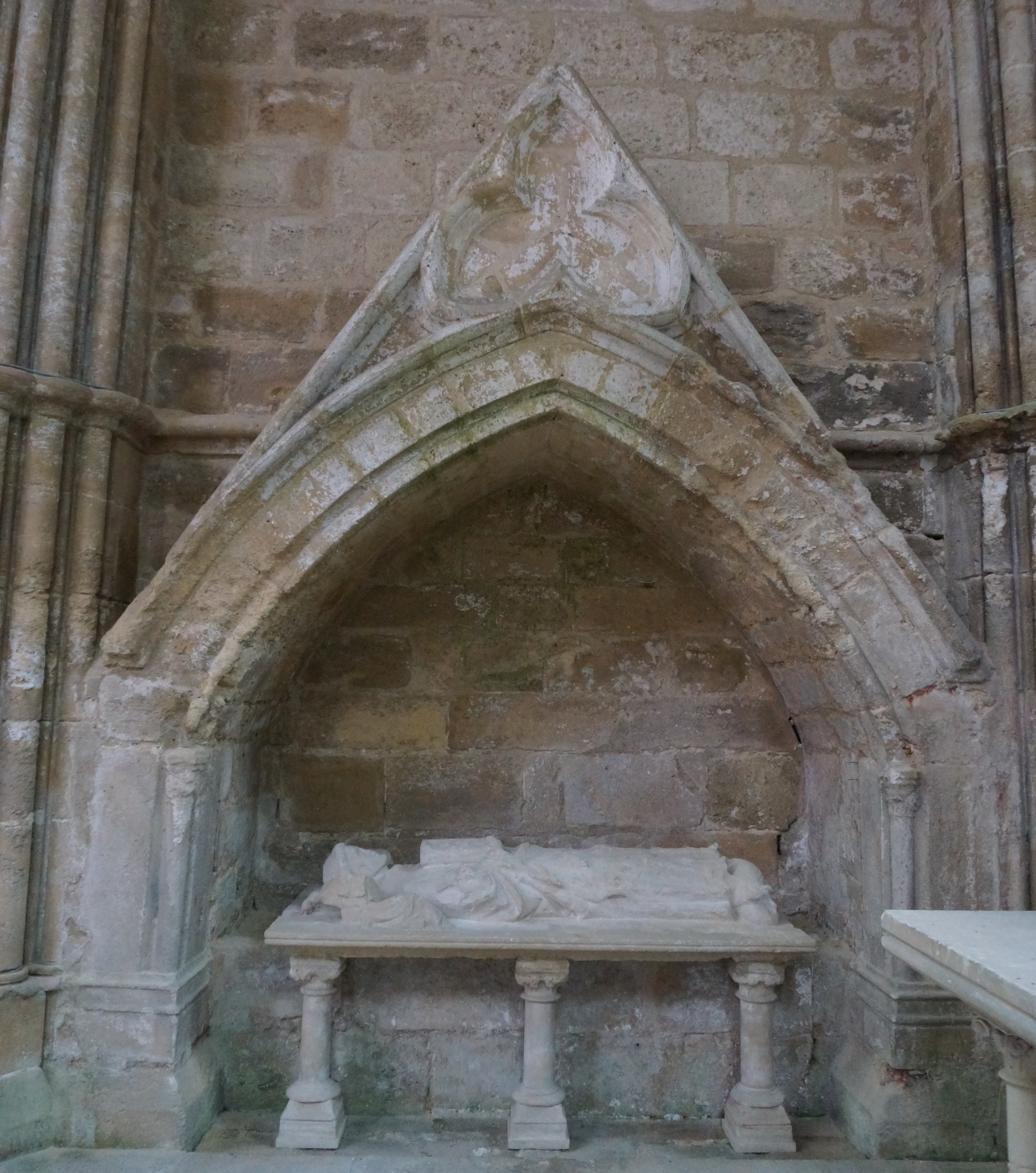
Abbot.

== See also ==
- Communes of the Aisne department
