= Chézy-en-Orxois =

- Commune
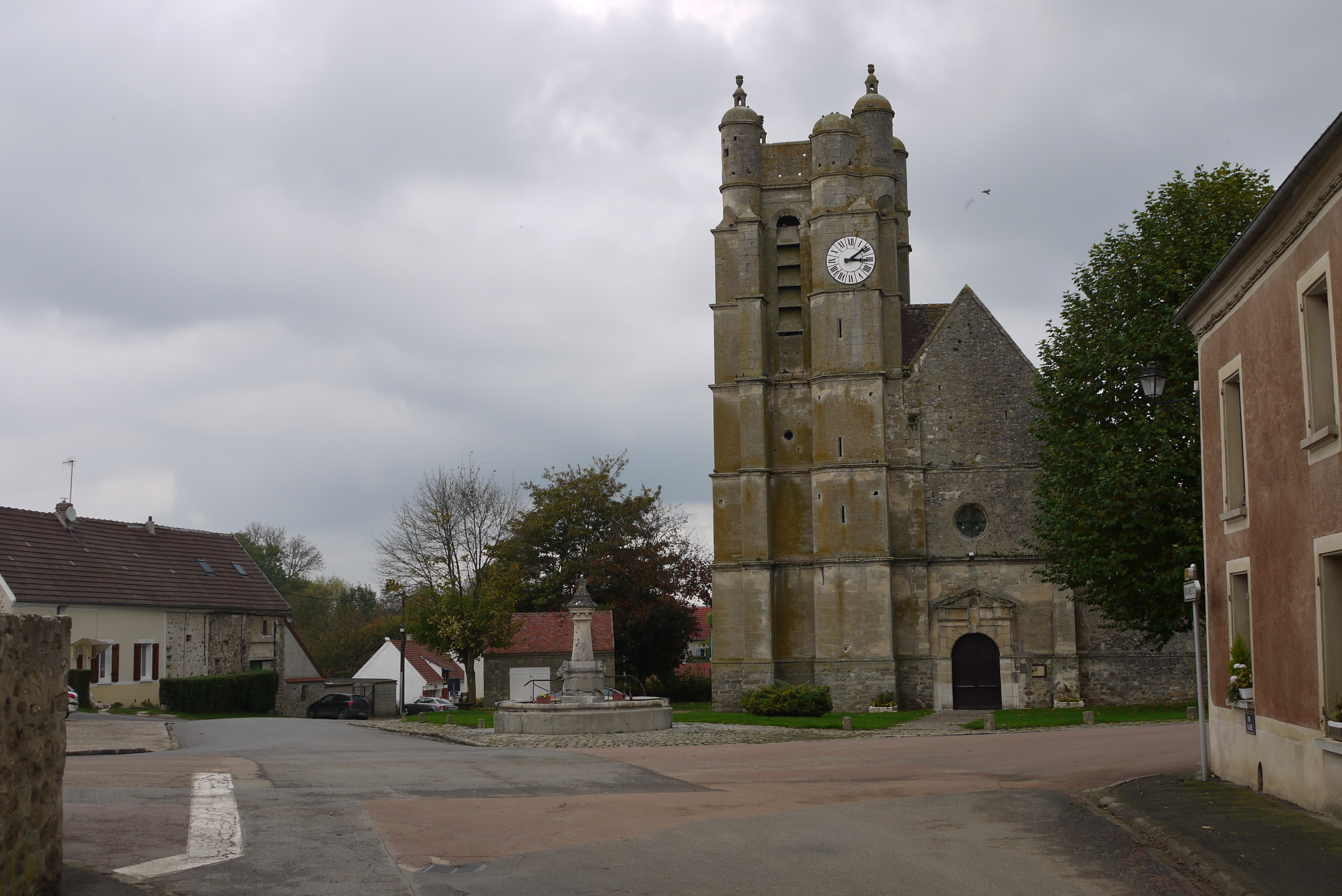
- The church of Chézy-en-Orxois
- Location of Chézy-en-Orxois
- Location within France Location within Hauts-de-France
- Coordinates: 49°07′28″N 3°10′57″E
- Country: France
- Region: Hauts-de-France
- Department: Aisne
- Arrondissement: Château-Thierry
- Canton: Villers-Cotterêts
- Intercommunality: CA Région de Château-Thierry

Government
  - Mayor (2026–32): Maryvonne Barbier
- Area^{1}: 16.15 km^{2} (6.24 sq mi)
- Elevation: 126 m (413 ft)
- Highest elevation: 169 m (554 ft)
- Lowest elevation: 65 m (213 ft)
- Population (2023): 389
  - Density: 24.1/km^{2} (62.4/sq mi)
- Time zone: UTC+01:00 (CET)
  - Summer (DST): UTC+02:00 (CEST)
- INSEE/Postal code: 02185 /02810
- ^{1} French Land Register data, which excludes lakes, ponds, glaciers > 1 km^{2} (0.386 sq mi or 247 acres) and river estuaries.

Chézy-en-Orxois (French pronunciation: [ʃezi ɑ̃.n‿ɔʁswa]) is a commune in the Aisne department in Hauts-de-France in northern France.

== Population ==
Historical population
Year	Pop.	±% p.a.
1968	381	—
1975	297	−3.50%
1982	302	+0.24%
1990	324	+0.88%
1999	346	+0.73%
2007	371	+0.88%
2012	377	+0.32%
2017	404	+1.39%
2023	389	−0.63%
Source: INSEE

== See also ==
- Communes of the Aisne department
