= Torcy-en-Valois =

- Commune
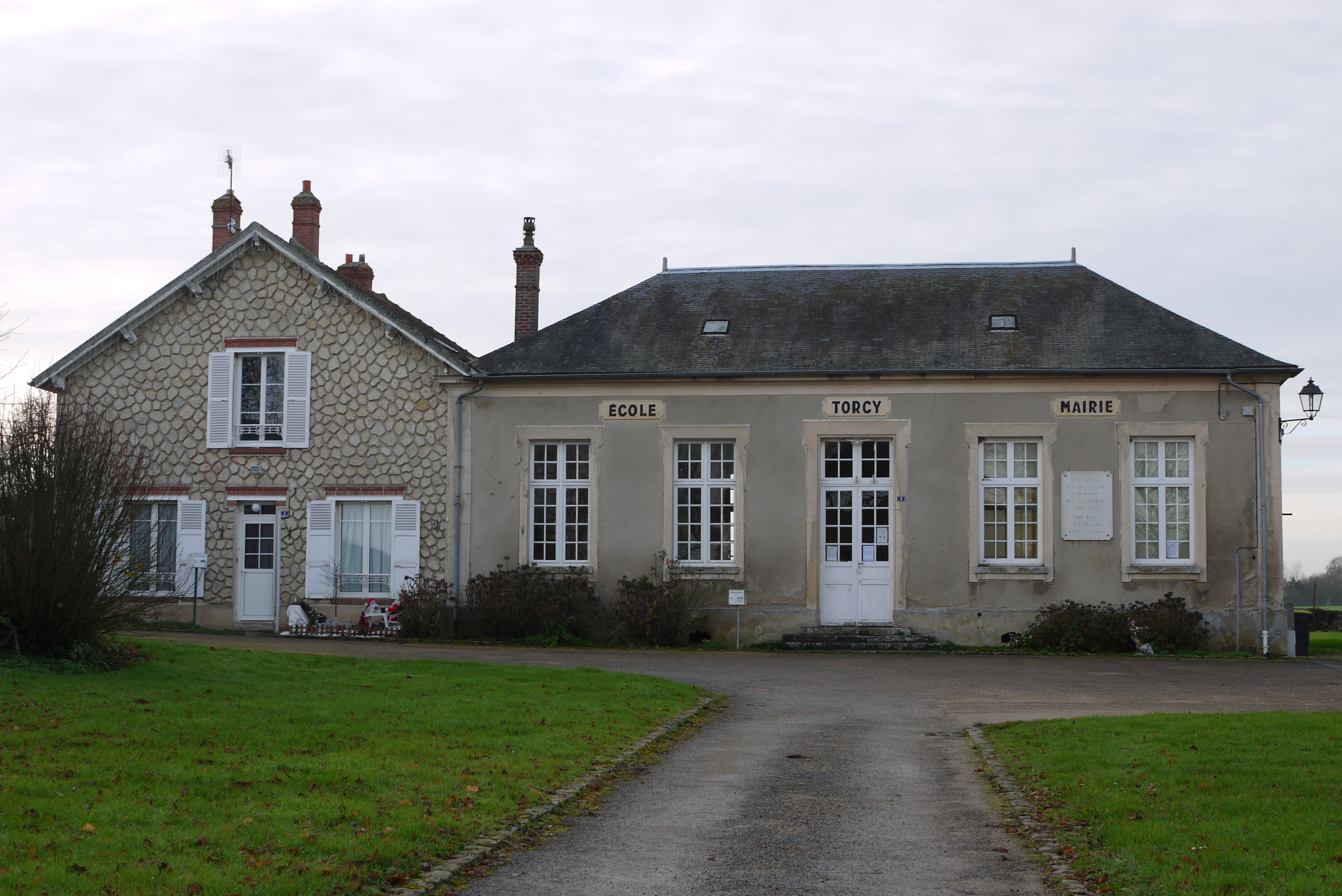
- The town hall and school of Torcy-en-Valois
- Location of Torcy-en-Valois
- Location within France Location within Hauts-de-France
- Coordinates: 49°05′18″N 3°16′45″E
- Country: France
- Region: Hauts-de-France
- Department: Aisne
- Arrondissement: Château-Thierry
- Canton: Villers-Cotterêts
- Intercommunality: CA Région de Château-Thierry

Government
  - Mayor (2026–32): Chantal Pascard
- Area^{1}: 3.62 km^{2} (1.40 sq mi)
- Elevation: 123 m (404 ft)
- Highest elevation: 175 m (574 ft)
- Lowest elevation: 82 m (269 ft)
- Population (2023): 81
  - Density: 22/km^{2} (58/sq mi)
- Time zone: UTC+01:00 (CET)
  - Summer (DST): UTC+02:00 (CEST)
- INSEE/Postal code: 02744 /02810
- ^{1} French Land Register data, which excludes lakes, ponds, glaciers > 1 km^{2} (0.386 sq mi or 247 acres) and river estuaries.

Torcy-en-Valois (French pronunciation: [tɔʁsi ɑ̃ valwa], lit. 'Torcy in Valois') is a commune in the Aisne department in Hauts-de-France in northern France.

== Population ==
Historical population
Year	Pop.	±% p.a.
1968	62	—
1975	38	−6.75%
1982	55	+5.42%
1990	80	+4.80%
1999	73	−1.01%
2007	81	+1.31%
2012	84	+0.73%
2017	73	−2.77%
2023	81	+1.75%
Source: INSEE

== See also ==
- Communes of the Aisne department
