= Saint-Gengoulph =

- Commune
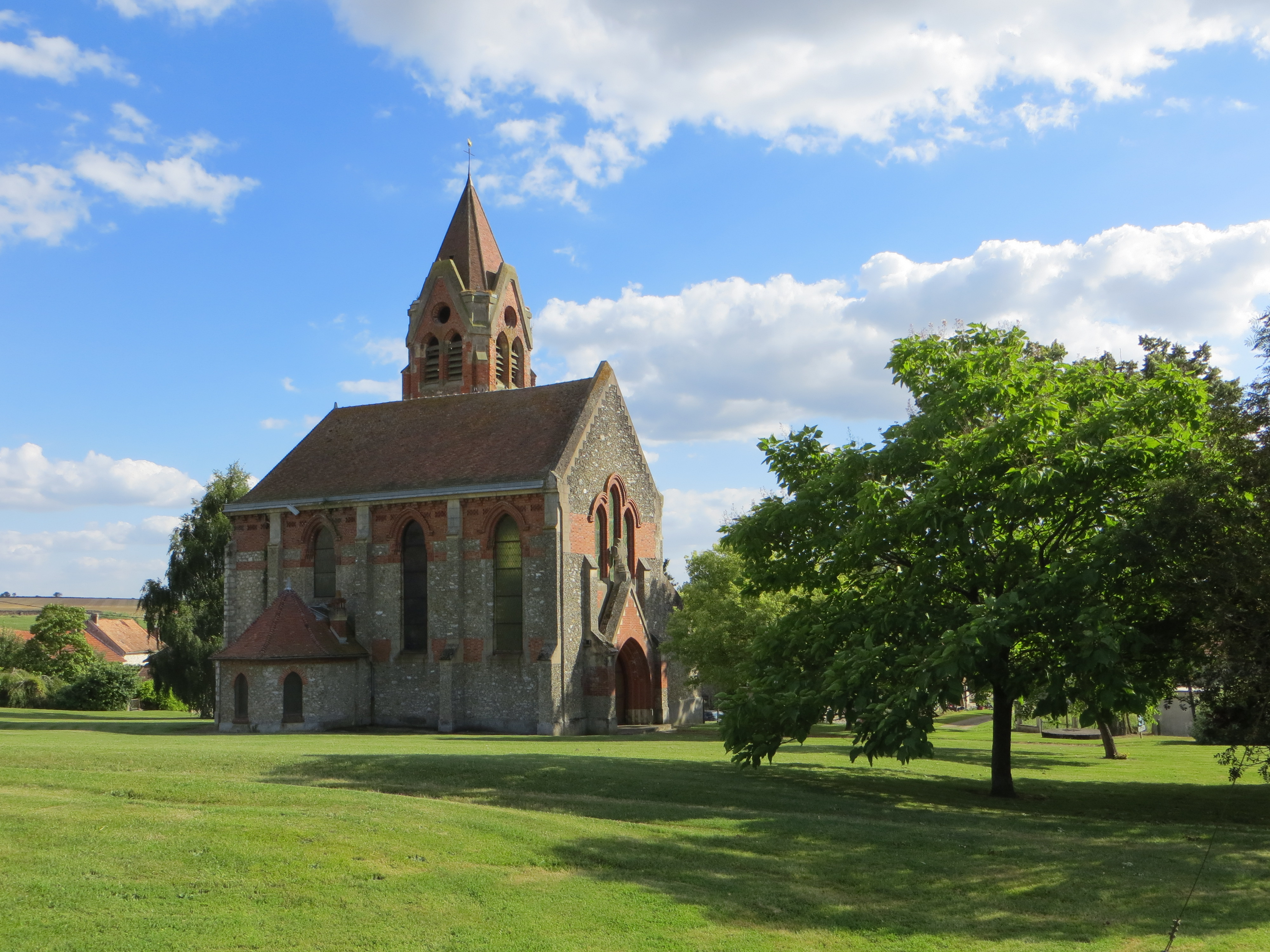
- The church of Saint-Gengoulph
- Location of Saint-Gengoulph
- Location within France Location within Hauts-de-France
- Coordinates: 49°07′12″N 3°13′07″E
- Country: France
- Region: Hauts-de-France
- Department: Aisne
- Arrondissement: Château-Thierry
- Canton: Villers-Cotterêts
- Intercommunality: CA Région de Château-Thierry

Government
  - Mayor (2026–32): Jean-Luc Pantoux
- Area^{1}: 7.57 km^{2} (2.92 sq mi)
- Elevation: 134 m (440 ft)
- Highest elevation: 169 m (554 ft)
- Lowest elevation: 70 m (230 ft)
- Population (2023): 152
  - Density: 20.1/km^{2} (52.0/sq mi)
- Time zone: UTC+01:00 (CET)
  - Summer (DST): UTC+02:00 (CEST)
- INSEE/Postal code: 02679 /02810
- ^{1} French Land Register data, which excludes lakes, ponds, glaciers > 1 km^{2} (0.386 sq mi or 247 acres) and river estuaries.

Saint-Gengoulph (French pronunciation: [sɛ̃ ʒɑ̃ɡulf]) is a commune in the Aisne department in Hauts-de-France in northern France.

== Population ==
Historical population
| Year | Pop. | ±% p.a. |
|---|---|---|
| 1968 | 128 | — |
| 1975 | 108 | −2.40% |
| 1982 | 92 | −2.26% |
| 1990 | 83 | −1.28% |
| 1999 | 141 | +6.06% |
| 2007 | 146 | +0.44% |
| 2012 | 148 | +0.27% |
| 2017 | 148 | +0.00% |
| 2023 | 152 | +0.45% |
Source: INSEE

== See also ==
- Communes of the Aisne department
