= Courchamps, Aisne =

Courchamps
- Commune
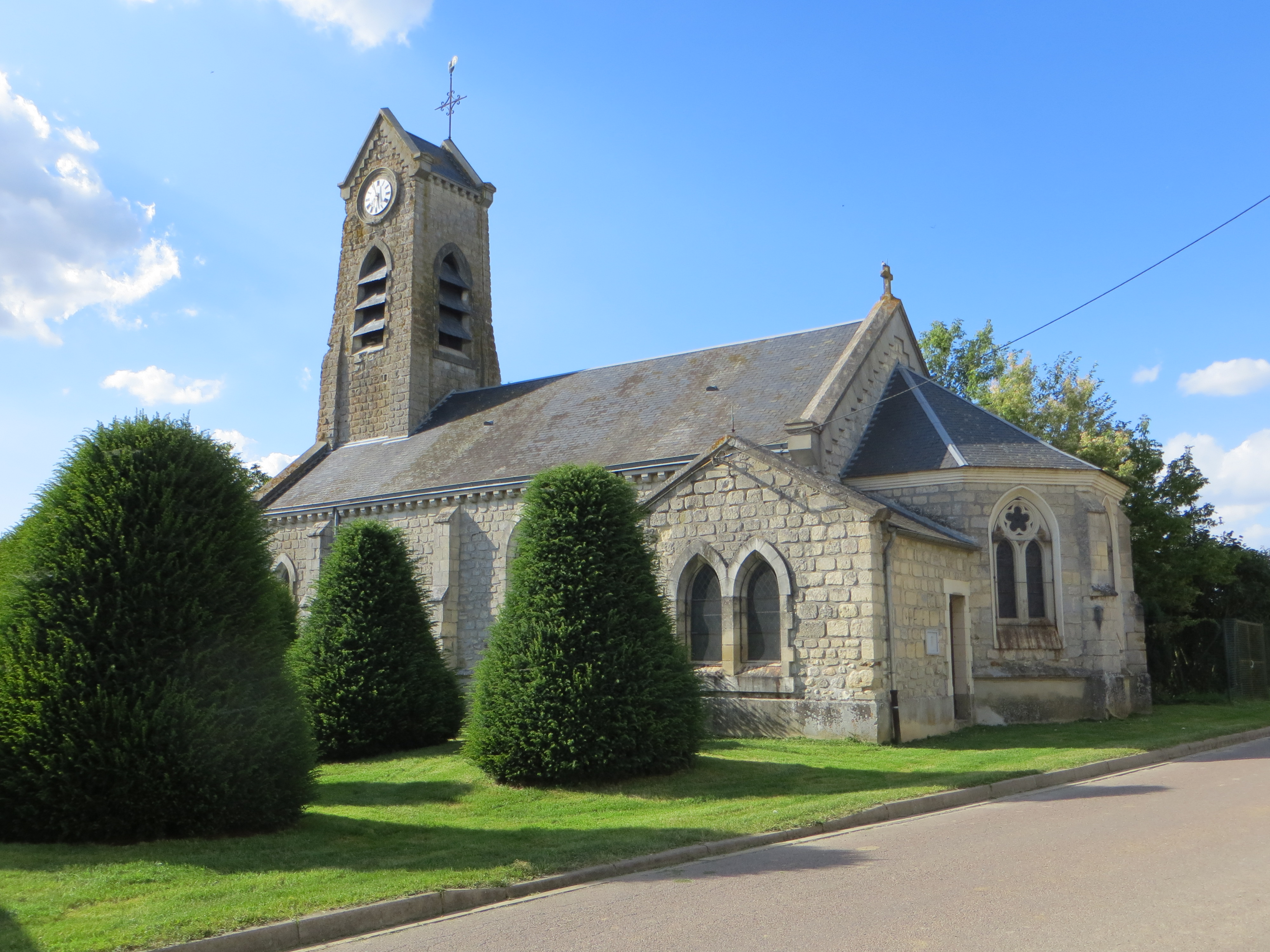
- The church of Courchamps
- Location of Courchamps
- Location within France Location within Hauts-de-France
- Coordinates: 49°06′50″N 3°15′57″E
- Country: France
- Region: Hauts-de-France
- Department: Aisne
- Arrondissement: Château-Thierry
- Canton: Villers-Cotterêts
- Intercommunality: CA Région de Château-Thierry

Government
  - Mayor (2026–32): Patrick Boutin
- Area^{1}: 2.72 km^{2} (1.05 sq mi)
- Elevation: 150 m (490 ft)
- Highest elevation: 178 m (584 ft)
- Lowest elevation: 106 m (348 ft)
- Population (2023): 82
  - Density: 30/km^{2} (78/sq mi)
- Time zone: UTC+01:00 (CET)
  - Summer (DST): UTC+02:00 (CEST)
- INSEE/Postal code: 02225 /02810
- ^{1} French Land Register data, which excludes lakes, ponds, glaciers > 1 km^{2} (0.386 sq mi or 247 acres) and river estuaries.

Courchamps (French pronunciation: [kuʁʃɑ̃]) is a commune in the Aisne department in Hauts-de-France in northern France.

== Population ==
Historical population
Year	Pop.	±% p.a.
1968	50	—
1975	42	−2.46%
1982	64	+6.20%
1990	107	+6.64%
1999	98	−0.97%
2007	90	−1.06%
2012	94	+0.87%
2017	88	−1.31%
2023	82	−1.17%
Source: INSEE

== See also ==
- Communes of the Aisne department
