= La Croix-sur-Ourcq =

- Commune
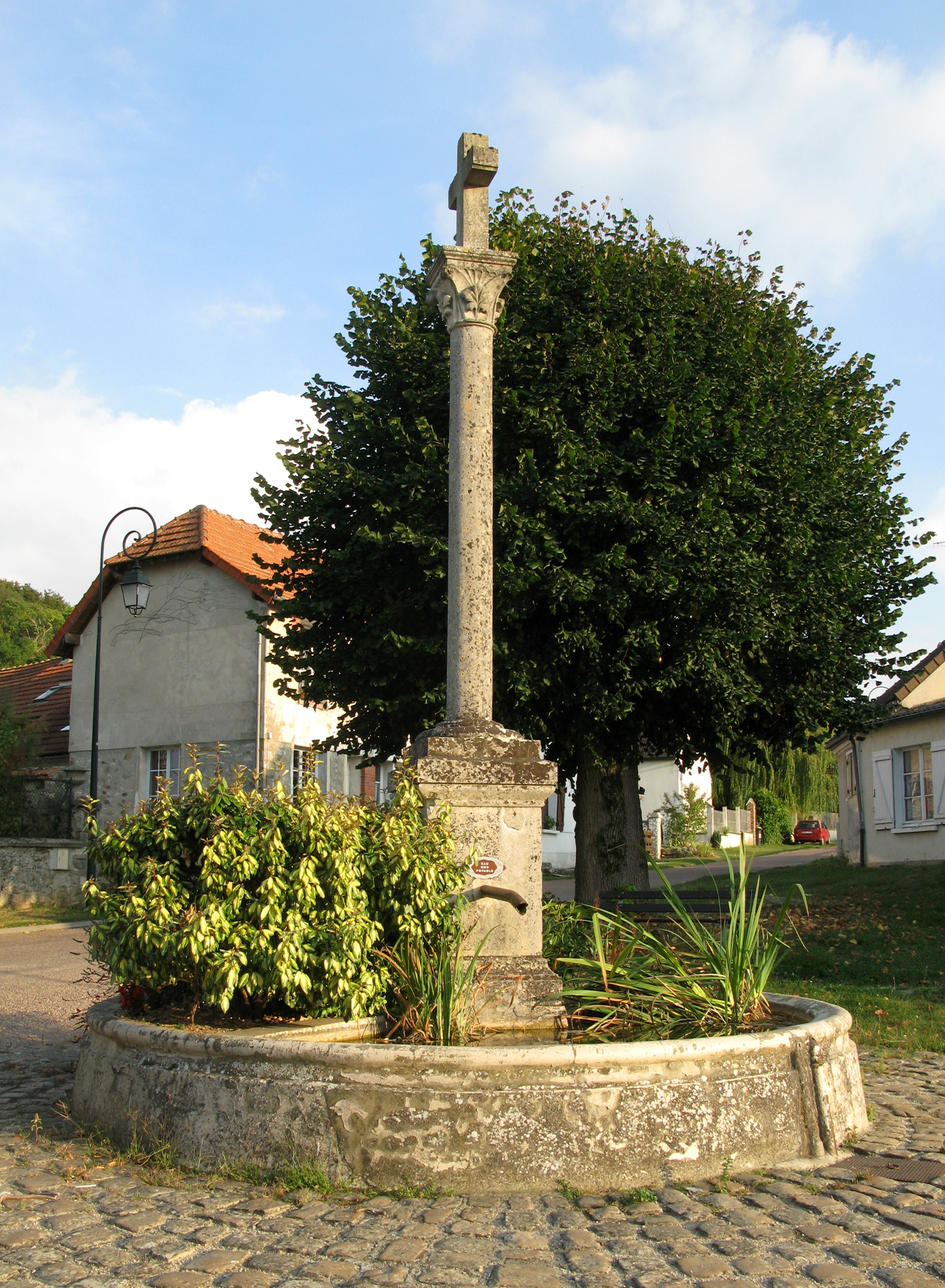
- War memorial
- Location of La Croix-sur-Ourcq
- Location within France Location within Hauts-de-France
- Coordinates: 49°10′09″N 3°21′15″E
- Country: France
- Region: Hauts-de-France
- Department: Aisne
- Arrondissement: Château-Thierry
- Canton: Villers-Cotterêts
- Intercommunality: CA Région de Château-Thierry

Government
  - Mayor (2026–32): Ludovic Gautier
- Area^{1}: 10.45 km^{2} (4.03 sq mi)
- Elevation: 136 m (446 ft)
- Highest elevation: 204 m (669 ft)
- Lowest elevation: 100 m (330 ft)
- Population (2023): 87
  - Density: 8.3/km^{2} (22/sq mi)
- Time zone: UTC+01:00 (CET)
  - Summer (DST): UTC+02:00 (CEST)
- INSEE/Postal code: 02241 /02210
- ^{1} French Land Register data, which excludes lakes, ponds, glaciers > 1 km^{2} (0.386 sq mi or 247 acres) and river estuaries.

La Croix-sur-Ourcq (French pronunciation: [la kʁwa syʁ uʁk]) is a commune in the Aisne department in Hauts-de-France in northern France.

== Population ==
Historical population
| Year | Pop. | ±% p.a. |
|---|---|---|
| 1968 | 124 | — |
| 1975 | 96 | −3.59% |
| 1982 | 108 | +1.70% |
| 1990 | 117 | +1.01% |
| 1999 | 91 | −2.75% |
| 2007 | 99 | +1.06% |
| 2012 | 124 | +4.61% |
| 2017 | 105 | −3.27% |
| 2023 | 87 | −3.09% |
Source: INSEE

== See also ==
- Communes of the Aisne department
