= List of aerial victories of Erich Loewenhardt =

Erich Loewenhardt was a German fighter ace of the First World War, credited with 54 confirmed aerial victories while flying with Jagdstaffel 10.

== List of victories ==
List
No.	Date/time	Victim	Squadron	Location
1	24 March 1917	Observation balloon (Note: Observation balloons were exceptionally hazardous targets, as they were guarded by anti-aircraft guns and fighter patrols.)	58th Company	Recicourt, France
2	14 August 1917 @ 1015 hours	Royal Aircraft Factory R.E.8	No. 9 Squadron RFC	Zillebeke, Belgium
3	5 September 1917 @ 1515 hours	Sopwith Pup	Possibly No. 46 Squadron RFC	Saint-Julien
4	9 September 1917 @ 2055 hours	Observation balloon	93rd Company	Alverhinghen, Belgium
5	21 September 1917 @ 1925 hours	Observation balloon		Vlamertinge, Belgium
6	14 October 1917 @ 1830 hours	Observation balloon		Northeast of Ypres, Belgium
7	18 October 1917 @ 0950 hours	Bristol F.2 Fighter	No. 22 Squadron RFC	Schloss Ardoie
8	30 November 1917 @ 1545 hours	Sopwith Camel	No. 3 Squadron RFC	Between Moeuvres and Bourlon Wood, France
9	5 January 1918 @ 1505 hours	Observation balloon	82nd Company	West of Saint Quentin
10	18 January 1918 @ 1025 hours	Bristol F.2 Fighter		Le Cateau-Cambrésis, France
11	12 March 1918 @ 1945 hours	Observation balloon		Lacouture
12	15 March 1918 @ 1905 hours	Observation balloon		Villers-Faucon, France
13	18 March 1918 @ 1110 hours	Airco DH.4 or Breguet 14		South of Le Cateau-Cambrésis, France
14	21 March 1918 @ 1310 hours	Observation balloon		Fins, Somme, France
15	27 March 1918 @ 0750 hours	Airco DH.4	No. 25 Squadron RFC	West of Miraumont, France
16	12 April 1918 @ 1225 hours	Sopwith Camel		Northwest of Peronne
17	23 April 1918 @ 0830 hours	Bristol F.2 Fighter	No. 57 Squadron RAF (Note: The Royal Flying Corps was merged with the Royal Naval Air Service on 1 April 1918 to form the Royal Air Force.)	West of Morisel, France
18	2 May 1918 @ 1230 hours	Royal Aircraft Factory SE.5a	No. 56 Squadron RAF	North of Montauban
19	9 May 1918 @ 1950 hours	Royal Aircraft Factory SE.5a		Hamel
20	10 May 1918 @ 2030 hours	Airco D.H.9	No. 27 Squadron RAF	Chaulnes, France
21	15 May 1918 @ 1325 hours	Airco D.H.9	No. 57 Squadron RAF	Mametz, (Note: This could be either of the two places with that name: Mametz, Pas-de-Calais and Mametz, Somme.) France
22	16 May 1918 @ 1545 hours	Spad		Maricourt, Somme, France
23	18 May 1918 @ 0745 hours	Sopwith Camel		Beaucourt, France
24	20 May 1918 @ 0730 hours	Observation balloon		Ransart, Pas-de-Calais, Southwest of Arras, France
25	2 June 1918 @ 1745 hours	Spad		La Croix, France
26	3 June 1918 @ 1830 hours	Spad		Dammard, France
27	5 June 1918 @ 1845 hours	Spad	Escadrille Spa.163, Service Aéronautique	Chateau-Thierry, France
28	22 June 1918 @ 2045 hours	Breguet 14		Bouvades
29	27 June 1918 @ 0915 hours	Spad		Dommieres
30	28 June 1918 @ 0820 hours	Spad		Billy
31	28 June 1918 @ 1230 hours	Spad S.11		North of Dampleux, France
32	30 June 1918 @ 2000 hours	Spad		La Ferté-Milon, France
33	2 July 1918 @ 0810 hours	Nieuport 28	27th Aero Squadron, United States Army Air Service	Bennes
34	2 July 1918 @ 0815 hours	Nieuport 28		Courchamps, France
35	14 July 1918 @ 0815 hours	Breguet 14		Verdilly, France
36	15 July 1918 @ 1307 hours	Sopwith Camel	No. 54 Squadron RAF	North of Dormans, France
37	16 July 1918 @ 1820 hours	Spad		Igny la Jard, France
38	18 July 1918 @ 0620 hours	Spad		Chouy, France
39	18 July 1918 @ 1430 hours	Spad		Grisolles, France
40	19 July 1918 @ 1130 hours	Spad		Courchamps, France
41	19 July 1918 @ 2050 hours	Spad		Verdilly, France
42	21 July 1918 @ 2015 hours	Sopwith Camel	No. 54 Squadron RAF	Fere-en-Tardenois, France
43	22 July 1918 @ 2030 hours	Sopwith Camel		Longpont, France
44	25 July 1918 @ 2050 hours	Spad	No. 54 Squadron RAF	Villers Helon
45	28 July 1918 @1510 hours	Spad		Fere-en-Tardenois, France
46	29 July 1918 @ 1930 hours	Spad		Coincy, France
47	30 July 1918 @ 1510 hours	Sopwith Camel	No. 73 Squadron RAF	Arcy
48	30 July 1918 @ 2010 hours	Sopwith Camel	No. 43 Squadron RAF	Saponay, France
49	8 August 1918 @ 1245 hours	Sopwith Camel		Proyart, France
50	8 August 1918 @ 1730 hours	Sopwith Camel		East of Bray
51	8 August 1918 @ 1850 hours	Sopwith Camel		Estrees, France
52	9 August 1918 @ 0740 hours	Sopwith Camel	No. 54 Squadron RAF	Estrees, France
53	9 August 1918 @ 1855 hours	Sopwith Camel	No. 201 Squadron RAF (Note: Formerly 1 Naval Squadron, until 1 April 1918.)	South of Cerisy, France
54	10 August 1918 @ 1215 hours	Royal Aircraft Factory SE.5a	No. 56 Squadron RAF	Chaulnes
