= List of aerial victories of Hans Kirschstein =

Hans Kirschstein (1896-1918) was a German First World War fighter ace credited with 27 confirmed aerial victories. Flying combat with Jagdstaffel 6 of the Imperial German Air Service, he shot down 26 enemy airplanes and an observation balloon between March and June 1918.

== The victory list ==
Hans Kirschstein's victories are reported in chronological order, which is not necessarily the order or dates the victories were confirmed by headquarters.

No.	Date	Time	Foe	Unit	Location	Remarks
1	18 March 1918	1105 hours	Sopwith Camel	No. 54 Squadron RFC	Vaux-Andigny, France	
2	27 March 1918	1520 hours	Armstrong Whitworth F.K.8	No. 2 Squadron RFC	Southwest of Albert, France	Ace Alan Arnett McLeod won a Victoria Cross
3	27 March 1918	1525 hours	Sopwith Camel	No. 3 Squadron RFC	Northeast of Albert, France	
4	2 April 1918	1820 hours	Royal Aircraft Factory SE.5a	No. 60 Squadron RAF	West of Harbonnières, France	
5	6 April 1918	1525 hours	Sopwith Camel	No. 43 Squadron RAF	Northeast of Wartisse	
6	7 April 1918	1145 hours	Sopwith Camel	No. 73 Squadron RAF	South of Proyart, France	
7	3 May 1918	1250 hours	SPAD		West of Pozières, France	
8	10 May 1918	1950 hours	Sopwith Camel	No. 80 Squadron RAF	Chipilly, France	
9	15 May 1918	1205 hours	Sopwith Camel	No. 209 Squadron RAF	East of Demuin, France	
10	15 May 1918	1515 hours	Bristol F.2 Fighter	No. 48 Squadron RAF	Southeast of Caix, France	
11	15 May 1918	1820 hours	Bristol F.2 Fighter	No. 11 Squadron RAF	Orvillers, France	
12	16 May 1918	1440 hours	Bristol F.2 Fighter	No. 62 Squadron RAF	Sailly-le-Sec, France	
13	16 May 1918	2110 hours	Royal Aircraft Factory SE.5a	No. 56 Squadron RAF	Contalmaison, France	Ace Trevor Durrant KIA
14	17 May 1918	1110 hours	Bréguet 14	Service Aéronautique	Cappy, France	
15	18 May 1918	0700 hours	Bréguet 14		East of Caix, France	
16	30 May 1918	1435 hours	Bréguet 14		Grand-Rozoy, France	
17	2 June 1918	1735 hours	SPAD two-seater		Cugny, France	
18	2 June 1918	2100 hours	Bréguet 14		Troesnes, France	
19	3 June 1918	1930 hours	Bréguet 14		Epaux-Bezu, France	
20	3 June 1918	1935 hours	Bréguet 14		Fere-en-Tardenois, France	
21	5 June 1918	1135 hours	SPAD	Escadrille Spa.163, Service Aéronautique	Villamont	
22	5 June 1918	1735 hours	Bréguet 14	Escadrille Br.227, Service Aéronautique	Ambleny, France	
23	5 June 1918	2025 hours	SPAD	Escadrille Spa.94, Service Aéronautique	Chezy-en-Orxois, France	
24	7 June 1918	0710 hours	SPAD two-seater		Montgobert, France	
25	14 June 1918	0900 hours	Observation balloon	Service Aéronautique	Villers-Cotterets, France	These crucial artillery direction posts were extremely hazardous targets.
26	14 June 1918	0915 hours	SPAD		Villers-Cotterets, France	
27	24 June 1918	0945 hours	Bréguet 14		Oulchy-le-Château, France	

This list is complete for entries, though obviously not for all details. Background data was abstracted from Above the Lines: The Aces and Fighter Units of the German Air Service, Naval Air Service and Flanders Marine Corps, 1914–1918, pp. 142–143; and The Aerodrome webpage on Hans Kirschstein . Added facts are individually cited. Abbreviations were expanded by the editor creating this list.
