= Nesles (disambiguation) =

Nesles is a commune in the Pas-de-Calais department in the Hauts-de-France region of France.

Nesles may also refer to the following places in France:

- Lumigny-Nesles-Ormeaux, Seine-et-Marne department, Île-de-France
- Nesles-la-Vallée, Val-d'Oise department, Île-de-France
- Nesles-la-Montagne, Aisne department, Hauts-de-France

== See also ==
- Nesle, Somme department, Hauts-de-France
