= Étrépilly =

Étrépilly is the name of two communes in France:

- Étrépilly, Aisne, in the Aisne département
- Étrépilly, Seine-et-Marne, in the Seine-et-Marne département
