= Diviciacus =

Diviciacus or Divitiacus is the name of two Gaulish noblemen of the 1st century BC:

- Diviciacus (Suessiones), king of the Suessiones
- Diviciacus (Aedui), druid and magistrate of the Aedui
