= Brécy =

Brécy may refer to the following places in France:

- Brécy, Aisne, a commune in the department of Aisne
- Brécy, Cher, a commune in the department of Cher
- Brécy-Brières, a commune in the department of Ardennes
- Saint-Gabriel-Brécy, a commune in the department of Calvados
