= Silvanectes =

Belgic tribe

The Silvanectes (or Sulbanectes) were a small Belgic tribe dwelling around present-day Senlis (Oise) during the Roman period.

== Name ==
=== Attestations ===
They are mentioned as Ulmanectes by Pliny (1st c. AD), as Soubánektoi (Greek: Σουβάνεκτοι) by Ptolemy (2nd c. AD), and as Siluanectas in the Notitia Dignitatum (5th c. AD).

The Silvanectes are also attested under the name Sulbanectes in an inscription, and their capital was mentioned as civitas Sulbanectium in 48 AD.

=== Etymology ===
The etymology of the ethnonym remains unclear. It could be a Latinized form of Gaulish *Seluanecti (from seluā- 'possession, property' > 'herd'; cf. Old Irish selb 'property, possession', Welsh ar helw 'in possession of'), corrupted under the influence of Latin silva ('forest').

The city of Senlis, attested ca. 400 AD as civitas Silvanectum ('civitas of the Silvanectes', Sinleti in the 6th c., Senliz in 1211) is named after the Gallic tribe.

== Geography ==
The Silvanectes dwelled southwest of the Suessionnes, near the Meldi and the Bellovaci. Their small territory, a depression surrounded by wooded heights, could be easily dominated by the more powerful Bellovaci, to which they were probably tributary.
