= Grisolles =

Grisolles may refer to the following places in France:

- Grisolles, Aisne, a commune in the department of Aisne
- Grisolles, Tarn-et-Garonne, a commune in the department of Tarn-et-Garonne
