= Brasles =

- Commune
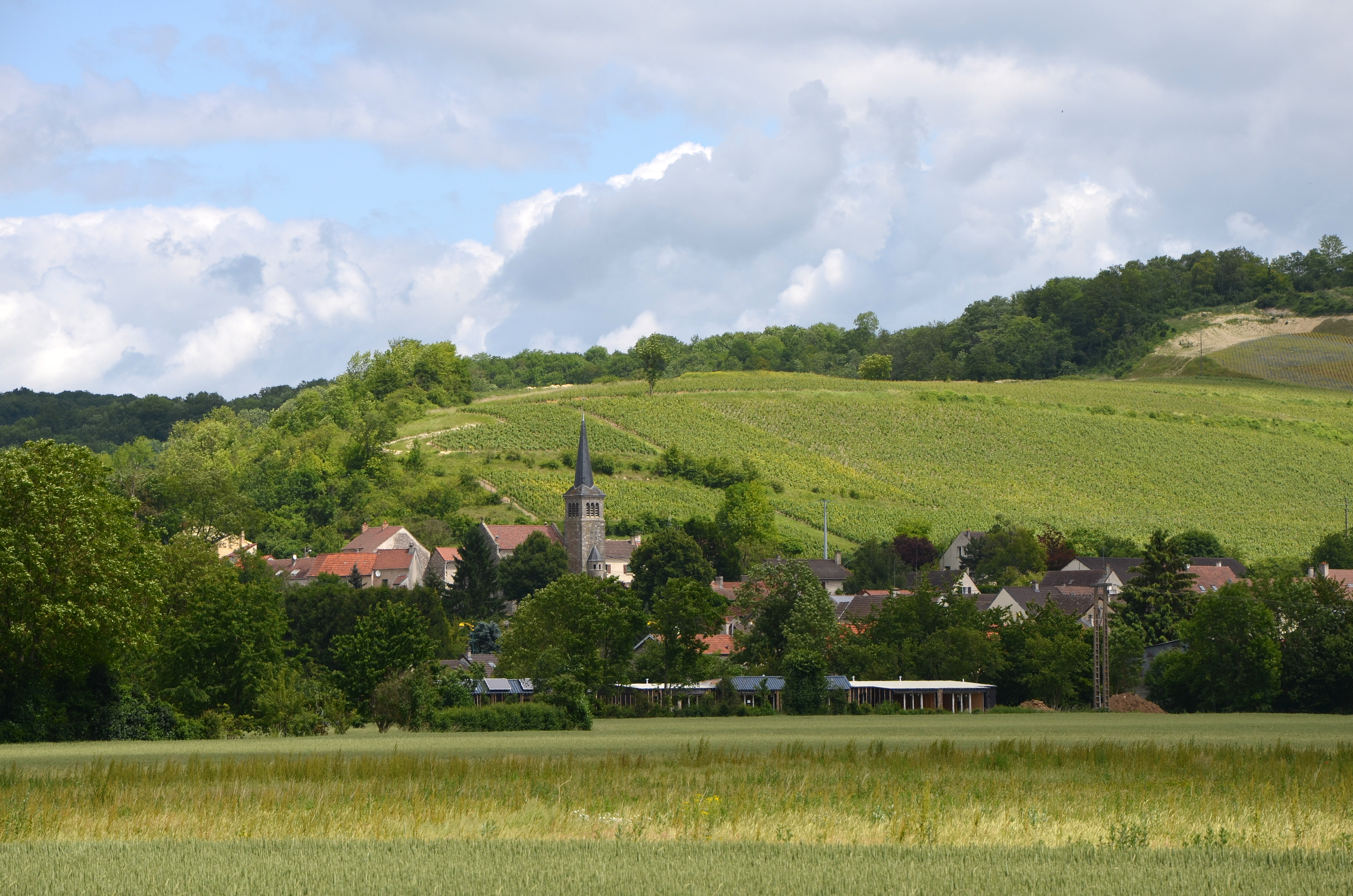
- A general view of Brasles
- Location of Brasles
- Location within France Location within Hauts-de-France
- Coordinates: 49°03′00″N 3°25′43″E
- Country: France
- Region: Hauts-de-France
- Department: Aisne
- Arrondissement: Château-Thierry
- Canton: Château-Thierry
- Intercommunality: CA Région de Château-Thierry

Government
  - Mayor (2026–32): Jérôme Lapointe
- Area^{1}: 7.45 km^{2} (2.88 sq mi)
- Elevation: 68 m (223 ft)
- Highest elevation: 214 m (702 ft)
- Lowest elevation: 61 m (200 ft)
- Population (2023): 1,788
  - Density: 240/km^{2} (622/sq mi)
- Time zone: UTC+01:00 (CET)
  - Summer (DST): UTC+02:00 (CEST)
- INSEE/Postal code: 02114 /02400
- ^{1} French Land Register data, which excludes lakes, ponds, glaciers > 1 km^{2} (0.386 sq mi or 247 acres) and river estuaries.

Brasles (French pronunciation: [bʁal]) is a commune in the department of Aisne in Hauts-de-France in northern France. It lies on the right (northern) bank of the river Marne, adjacent to the east of the town Château-Thierry.

== Population ==
Historical population
Year	Pop.	±% p.a.
1968	1,031	—
1975	1,005	−0.36%
1982	1,208	+2.66%
1990	1,206	−0.02%
1999	1,236	+0.27%
2007	1,264	+0.28%
2012	1,392	+1.95%
2017	1,529	+1.90%
2023	1,788	+2.64%
Source: INSEE

== See also ==
- Communes of the Aisne department
