= Gland, Aisne =

Gland
- Commune
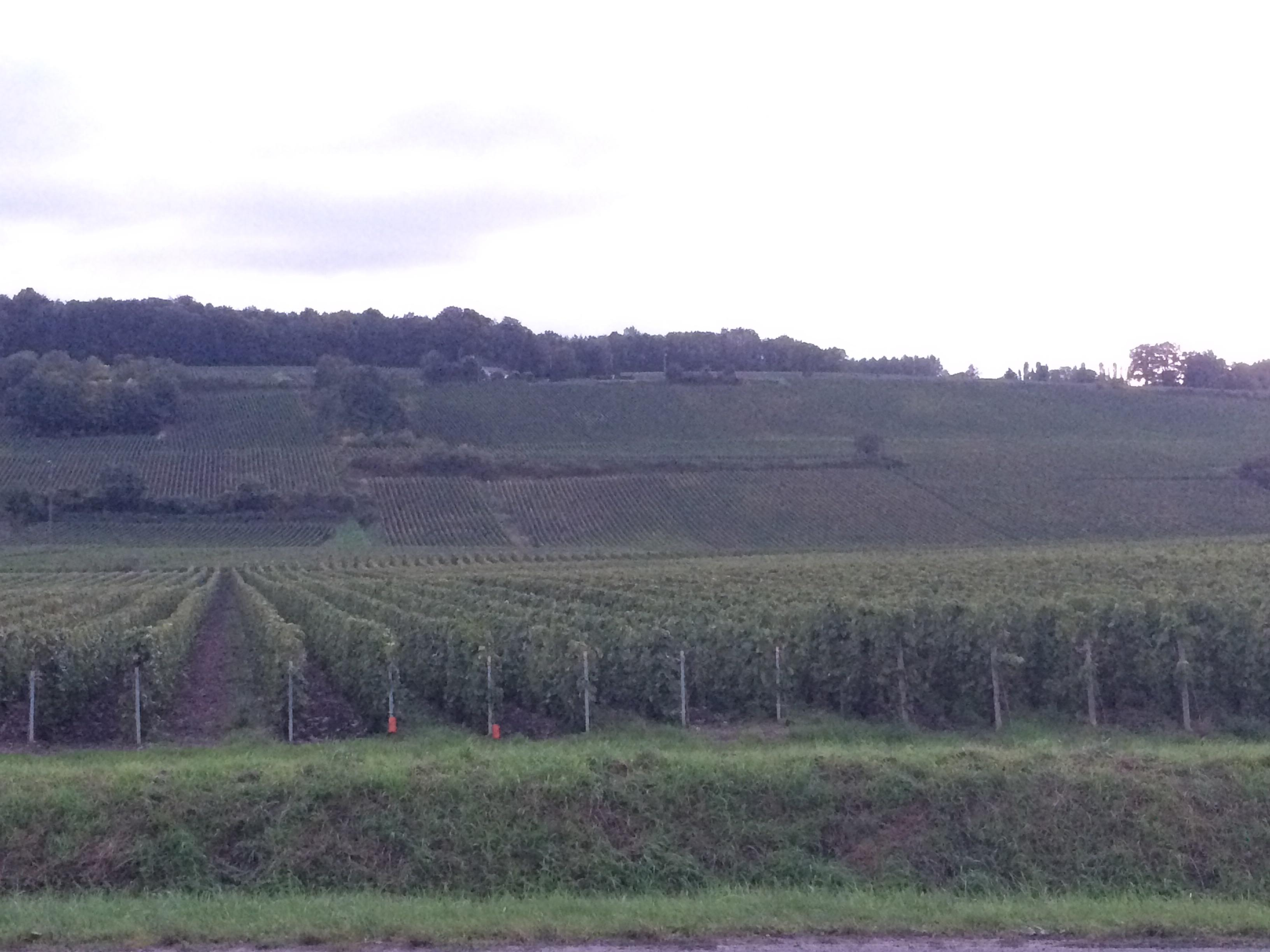
- Vineyards of Gland

- Coat of arms
- Location of Gland
- Location within France Location within Hauts-de-France
- Coordinates: 49°02′56″N 3°27′47″E
- Country: France
- Region: Hauts-de-France
- Department: Aisne
- Arrondissement: Château-Thierry
- Canton: Château-Thierry
- Intercommunality: CA Région de Château-Thierry

Government
  - Mayor (2026–32): Stéphanie Cleren
- Area^{1}: 5.65 km^{2} (2.18 sq mi)
- Elevation: 70 m (230 ft)
- Highest elevation: 218 m (715 ft)
- Lowest elevation: 62 m (203 ft)
- Population (2023): 425
  - Density: 75.2/km^{2} (195/sq mi)
- Time zone: UTC+01:00 (CET)
  - Summer (DST): UTC+02:00 (CEST)
- INSEE/Postal code: 02347 /02400
- ^{1} French Land Register data, which excludes lakes, ponds, glaciers > 1 km^{2} (0.386 sq mi or 247 acres) and river estuaries.

Gland (French pronunciation: [ɡlɑ̃]) is a commune in the Aisne department in Hauts-de-France in northern France.

== Population ==
Historical population
Year	Pop.	±% p.a.
1968	316	—
1975	365	+2.08%
1982	467	+3.58%
1990	503	+0.93%
1999	452	−1.18%
2007	472	+0.54%
2012	474	+0.08%
2017	450	−1.03%
2023	425	−0.95%
Source: INSEE

== See also ==
- Communes of the Aisne department
