= Galba (Suessiones) =

1st century BC king of the Suessiones, a Celtic polity in Belgic Gaul

King of the Suessiones
- Preceded by: Diviciacus?

Personal details
- Born: c. 1st century BC Belgic confederation
- Children: Two unnamed sons
- Occupation: Aristocrat; Politician
- Military career
- Allegiance: Belgae
- Conflicts: Gallic Wars: Battle of the Axona; Siege of Noviodunum (surrendered)

Galba (fl. 57 BC) was a king of the Suessiones, a Gallic tribe that was part of the Belgic confederation, during the Gallic Wars (58–50 BC). After Julius Caesar militarily intervened against the Helvetii and Suebi in 58 BC, many of the Belgic tribes were alarmed and formed a defensive alliance. Galba was elected commander-in-chief of the combined Belgic force.

In 57 BC, Caesar invaded the lands of the Belgae and Galba led the Belgic host against the Romans at the Battle of the Axona where they were repelled. After their defeat, the Belgic leaders decided to disperse and return to their homelands to fight the Romans separately. Galba returned with his army to the Suessiones' capital of Noviodunum (present-day Pommiers), and found that Caesar's forces had already besieged the town. Despite reinforcing Noviodunum's defenders with his own returned army, Galba surrendered due to the size and scale of the Roman siegeworks.

== Etymology ==
The name Galba is attested both among the Gauls as a personal name and among Romans as a cognomen. According to Suetonius, Galba means "fat" in Gaulish (compare Old Irish golb, "paunchy, fat"), and Galba is generally regarded as Celtic in origin. Since physical fitness was a requirement of Gallic fighting men, who might be fined if they reported for duty overweight, the Celtic name is likely either to have lost the connotations of its original meaning, or in regard to a king to refer to "fat times" or prosperity.

As a Roman cognomen, Galba is associated with a branch of the gens Sulpicia. Although the most famous bearer is the Emperor Galba in the 1st century AD, a Servius Sulpicius Galba also served under Caesar in Gaul.

== Biography ==
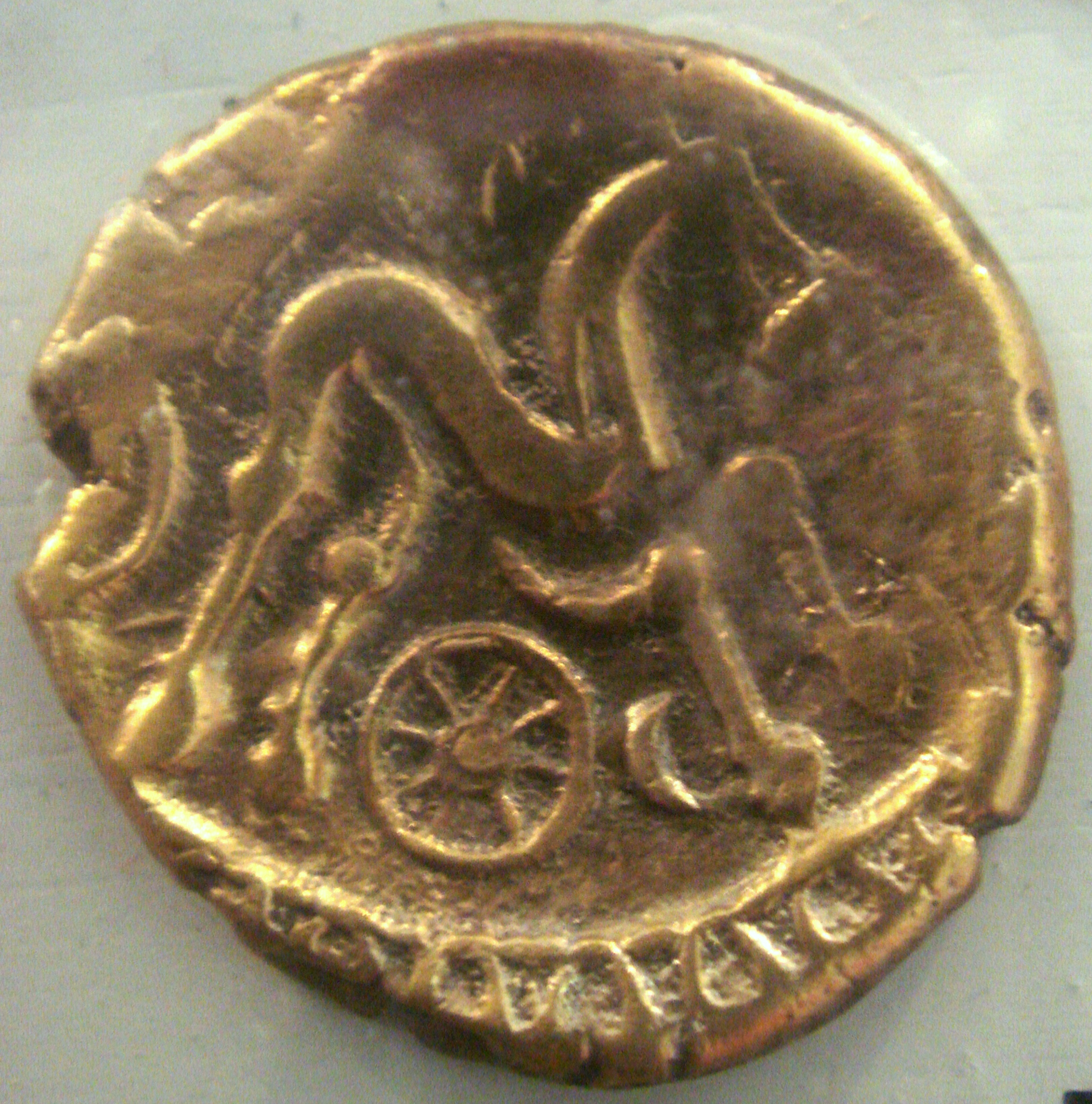
A coin of the Suessiones, ruled in the mid-1st century BC by Galba

=== Background ===
Galba belonged to the Suessiones, a Gallic tribe that resided in the Aisne and Oise departments of present-day France during the Late Iron Age. The Suessiones were part of a large confederation of Celto-Germanic tribes known as the Belgae and possessed close cultural and political ties with the neighboring Remi. Under the rule of Diviciacus (c. 80 BC), the Suessiones became one of the most powerful tribes in Gaul, controlling not only a large portion of Belgica but also southeastern Britain. At some point following the reign of Diviciacus, Galba became ruler of the Suessiones.

=== Outbreak of the Gallic Wars ===
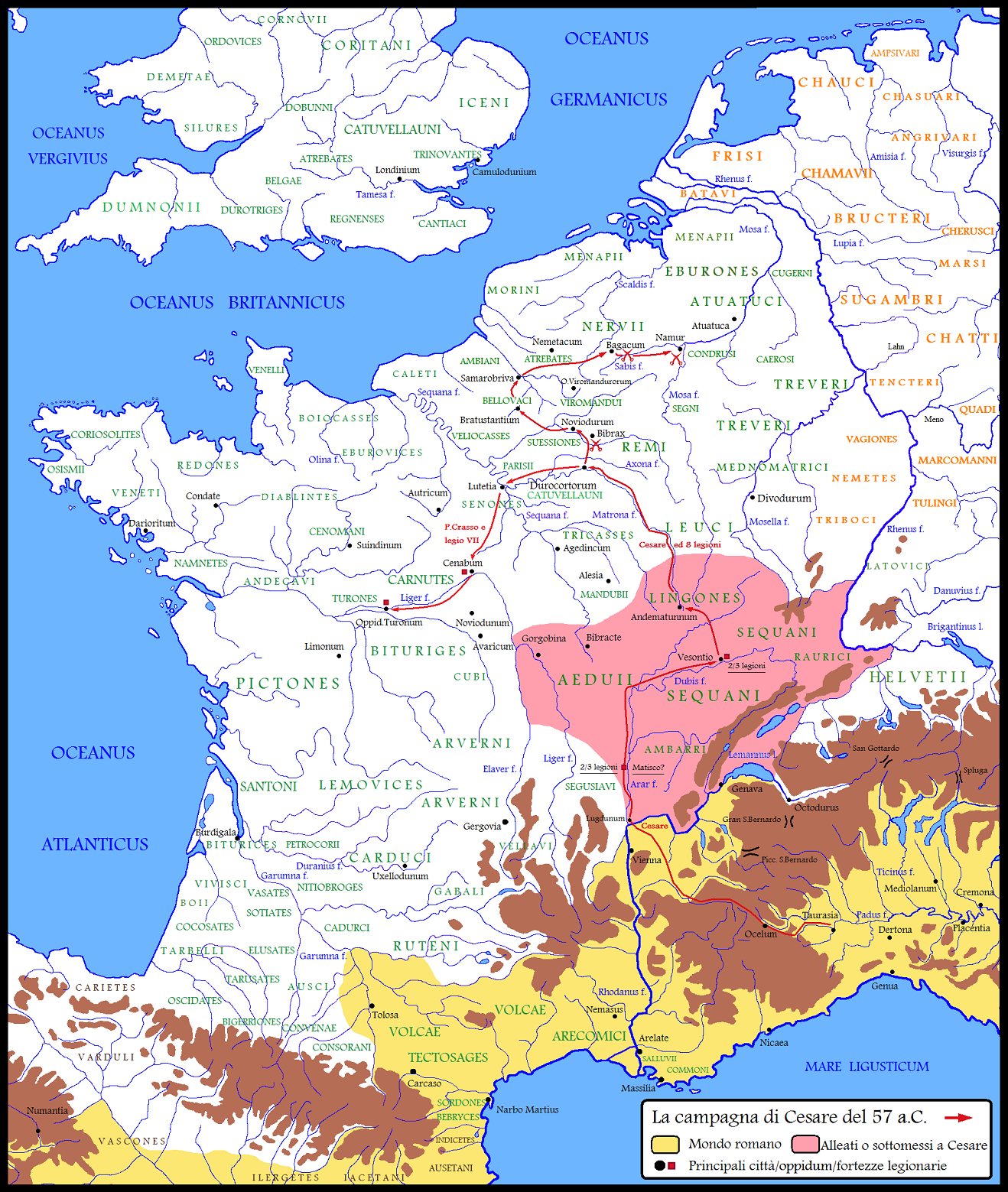
Campaign map of 57 BC. Roman-occupied territory is shaded red. Note the Roman victory near Bibrax.

In 58 BC, the Roman conquest of Gaul would begin after Julius Caesar intervened to halt the migration of the Helvetii and invaded the Sequani to drive out the Suebian king Ariovistus. These actions alarmed many among the Belgae who were concerned by the growing Roman military presence and over the winter of 58–57 BC, preparations for a military alliance would be made. Galba would be chosen to lead the combined Belgic forces due to his sense of justice (iustitia) and intelligence (prudentia) according to Caesar.

In early 57 BC, Caesar invaded the territory of the Belgae where he secured the support of the Remi. Galba assembled the forces of the Belgae and led the host against them, initially attempting to capture the fortified town of Bibrax from the Remi but withdrawing after the arrival of Roman reinforcements in order to face the entire Roman force directly near the Axona (Aisne river). At the resulting Battle of the Axona, the Belgae failed to rout the Romans and began to suffer from food shortages due to the size of their force. On account of this, a war council was assembled and it was decided to disband the Belgic army and for the tribes to fight from their own territories to reduce the strain on their resources.

=== Siege of Noviodunum ===
With the disbandment of the Belgic force, Galba began to lead his warriors back to their territory but Caesar, recognizing that he could take their lands easily if he arrived first, rushed the legions to the territory of the Suessiones and laid siege to their capital of Noviodunum (present-day Pommiers, Aisne). Despite successfully arriving ahead of Galba, the town's walls were too high to storm and so Caesar ordered the preparation of siege weapons. Galba would return shortly after and his forces entered the town under the cover of night to bolster its defenders. Upon the completion of the Roman siegeworks, however, the Suessiones were intimidated as Roman-style siege warfare was unknown to the Gauls and offered their surrender which Caesar accepted due to intercession by the Remi.

Galba's two sons were then taken as hostages along with the chief men of the state and the Suessiones surrendered their weapons. He isn't mentioned again in Caesar's writings.

== Bibliography ==
- Schön, Franz (2006). "Suessiones". Brill's New Pauly. doi:10.1163/1574-9347_bnp_e1125110.
