= Bouresches =

- Commune
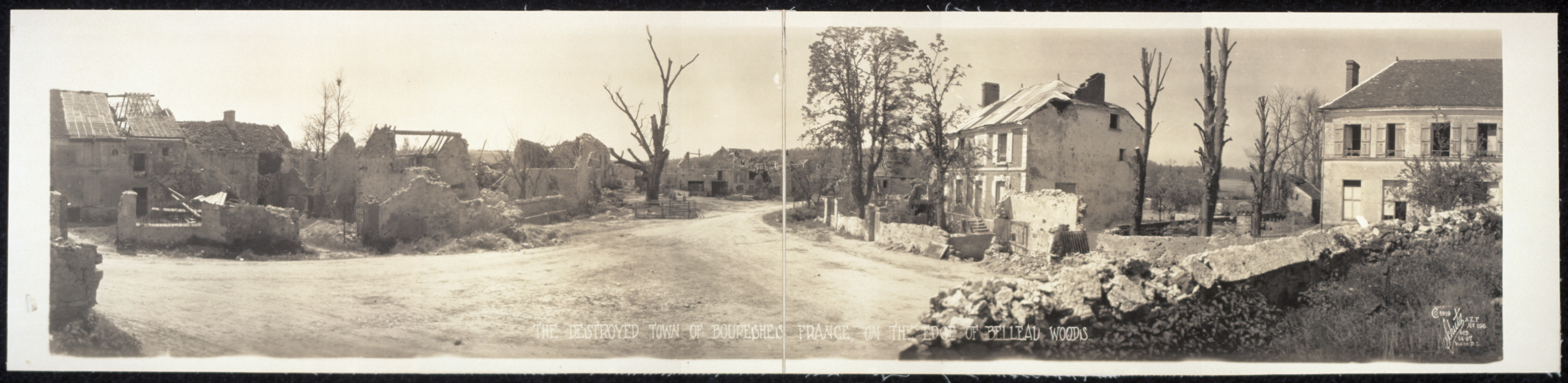
- The destroyed town in 1918
- Location of Bouresches
- Location within France Location within Hauts-de-France
- Coordinates: 49°03′51″N 3°18′37″E
- Country: France
- Region: Hauts-de-France
- Department: Aisne
- Arrondissement: Château-Thierry
- Canton: Château-Thierry
- Intercommunality: CA Région de Château-Thierry

Government
  - Mayor (2026–32): Emilie Kleiber
- Area^{1}: 7.52 km^{2} (2.90 sq mi)
- Elevation: 123 m (404 ft)
- Highest elevation: 217 m (712 ft)
- Lowest elevation: 105 m (344 ft)
- Population (2023): 183
  - Density: 24.3/km^{2} (63.0/sq mi)
- Time zone: UTC+01:00 (CET)
  - Summer (DST): UTC+02:00 (CEST)
- INSEE/Postal code: 02105 /02400
- ^{1} French Land Register data, which excludes lakes, ponds, glaciers > 1 km^{2} (0.386 sq mi or 247 acres) and river estuaries.

Bouresches (French pronunciation: [buʁɛʃ]) is a commune in the department of Aisne in Hauts-de-France in northern France.

== Population ==
Historical population
Year	Pop.	±% p.a.
1968	205	—
1975	172	−2.48%
1982	180	+0.65%
1990	166	−1.01%
1999	183	+1.09%
2007	205	+1.43%
2012	200	−0.49%
2017	202	+0.20%
2023	183	−1.63%
Source: INSEE

== See also ==
- Communes of the Aisne department
