= Chierry =

- Commune
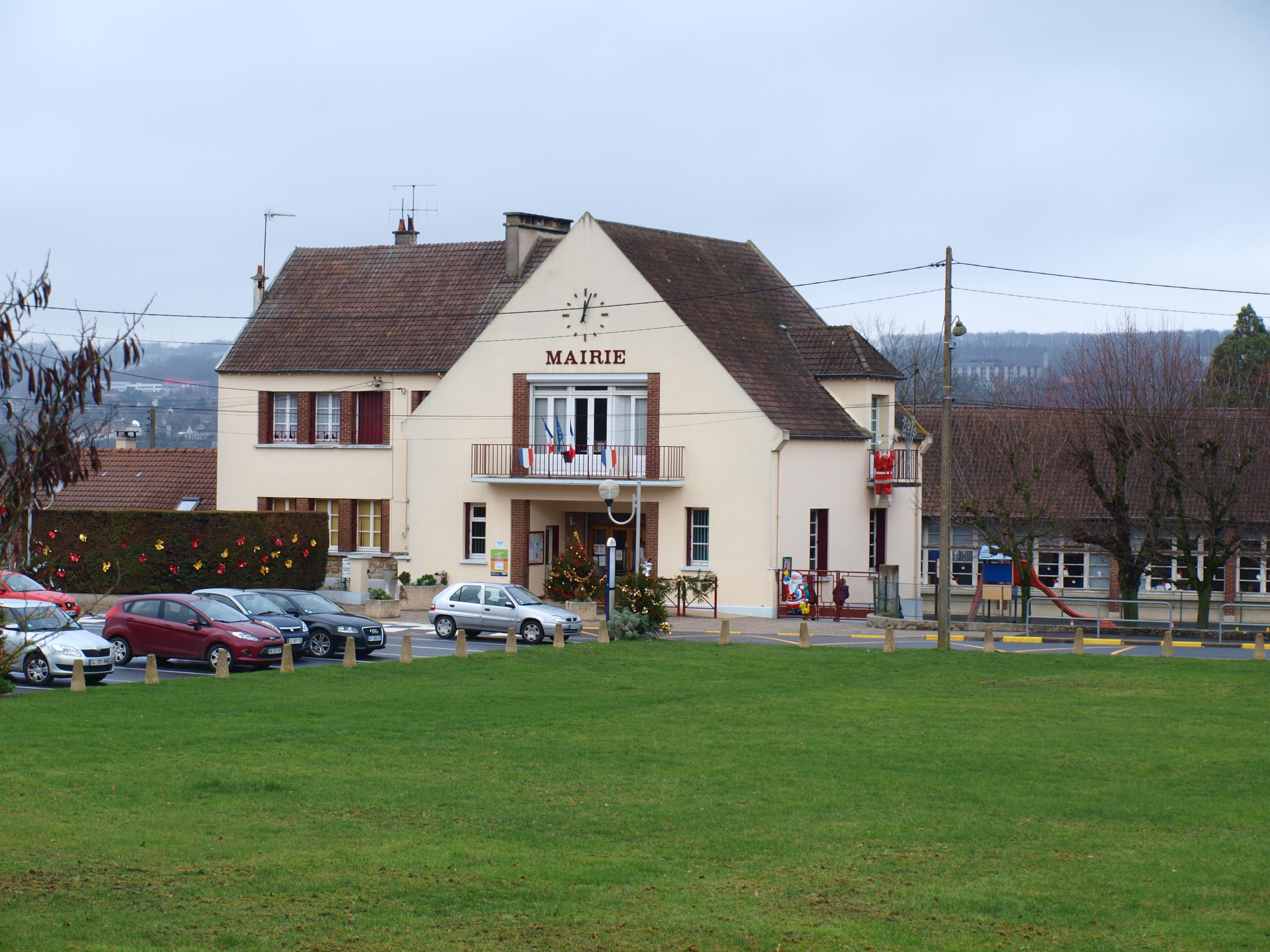
- The town hall of Chierry
- Location of Chierry
- Location within France Location within Hauts-de-France
- Coordinates: 49°02′23″N 3°25′49″E
- Country: France
- Region: Hauts-de-France
- Department: Aisne
- Arrondissement: Château-Thierry
- Canton: Château-Thierry
- Intercommunality: CA Région de Château-Thierry

Government
  - Mayor (2026–32): Jean-Marc Sclavon
- Area^{1}: 2.82 km^{2} (1.09 sq mi)
- Elevation: 80 m (260 ft)
- Highest elevation: 217 m (712 ft)
- Lowest elevation: 61 m (200 ft)
- Population (2023): 1,195
  - Density: 424/km^{2} (1,100/sq mi)
- Time zone: UTC+01:00 (CET)
  - Summer (DST): UTC+02:00 (CEST)
- INSEE/Postal code: 02187 /02400
- ^{1} French Land Register data, which excludes lakes, ponds, glaciers > 1 km^{2} (0.386 sq mi or 247 acres) and river estuaries.

Chierry (French pronunciation: [ʃjɛʁi]) is a commune in the Aisne department in Hauts-de-France in northern France.

== Population ==
Historical population
Year	Pop.	±% p.a.
1968	1,009	—
1975	1,170	+2.14%
1982	1,117	−0.66%
1990	1,120	+0.03%
1999	1,034	−0.88%
2007	1,048	+0.17%
2012	1,042	−0.11%
2017	1,109	+1.25%
2023	1,195	+1.25%
Source: INSEE

== See also ==
- Communes of the Aisne department
