= Épieds, Aisne =

Épieds
- Commune
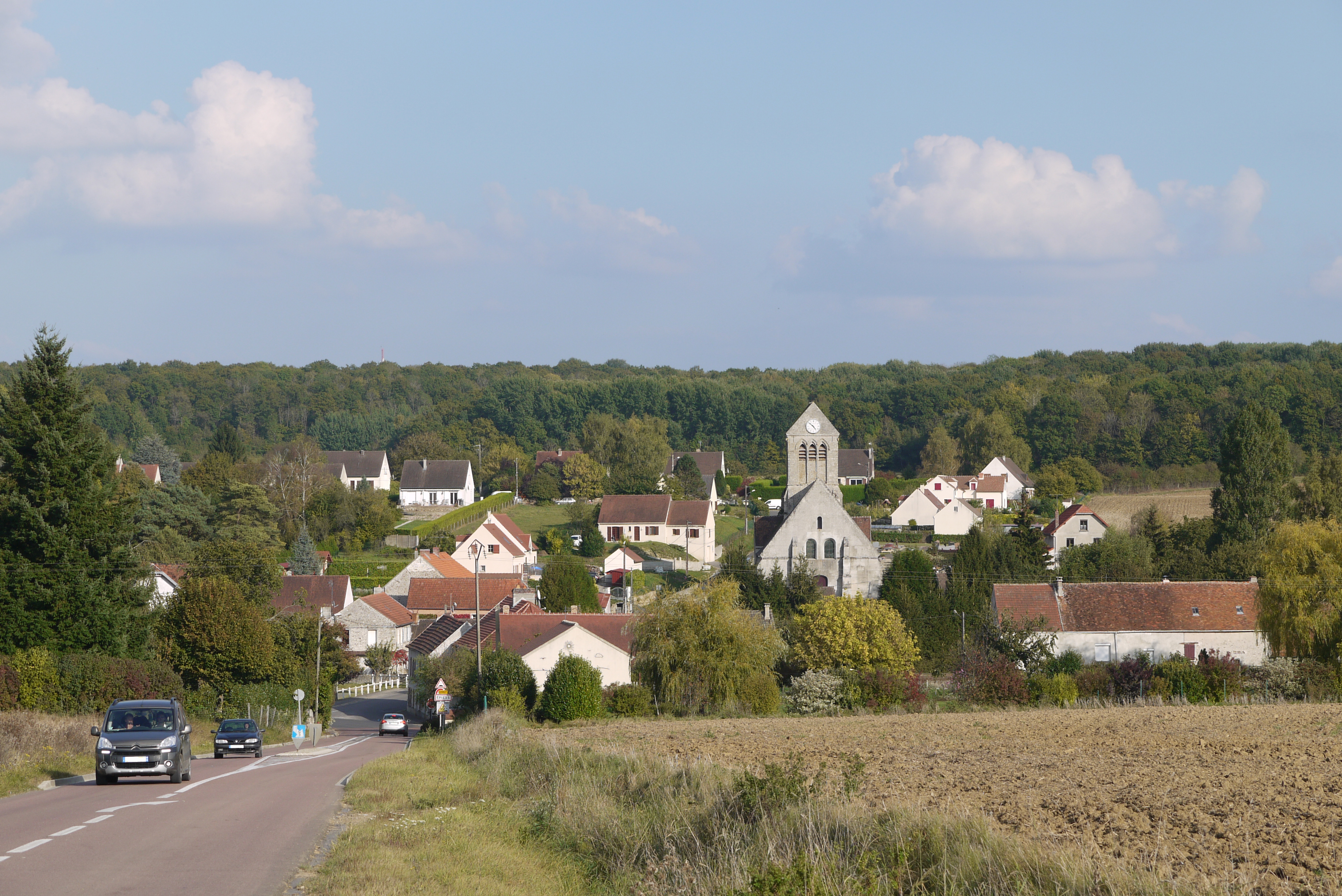
- A general view of Épieds
- Location of Épieds
- Location within France Location within Hauts-de-France
- Coordinates: 49°06′26″N 3°26′44″E
- Country: France
- Region: Hauts-de-France
- Department: Aisne
- Arrondissement: Château-Thierry
- Canton: Château-Thierry
- Intercommunality: CA Région de Château-Thierry

Government
  - Mayor (2026–32): Didier Crenet
- Area^{1}: 18.66 km^{2} (7.20 sq mi)
- Elevation: 180 m (590 ft)
- Highest elevation: 222 m (728 ft)
- Lowest elevation: 125 m (410 ft)
- Population (2023): 395
  - Density: 21.2/km^{2} (54.8/sq mi)
- Time zone: UTC+01:00 (CET)
  - Summer (DST): UTC+02:00 (CEST)
- INSEE/Postal code: 02280 /02400
- ^{1} French Land Register data, which excludes lakes, ponds, glaciers > 1 km^{2} (0.386 sq mi or 247 acres) and river estuaries.

Épieds (French pronunciation: [epje]) is a commune in the Aisne department in Hauts-de-France in northern France.

== Population ==
Historical population
Year	Pop.	±% p.a.
1968	192	—
1975	175	−1.32%
1982	232	+4.11%
1990	332	+4.58%
1999	332	+0.00%
2007	362	+1.09%
2012	394	+1.71%
2017	392	−0.10%
2023	395	+0.13%
Source: INSEE

== See also ==
- Communes of the Aisne department
