= Battle of the Axona =

Battle between the Roman army of Gaius Julius Caesar and the Belgae

- Part of the Gallic Wars
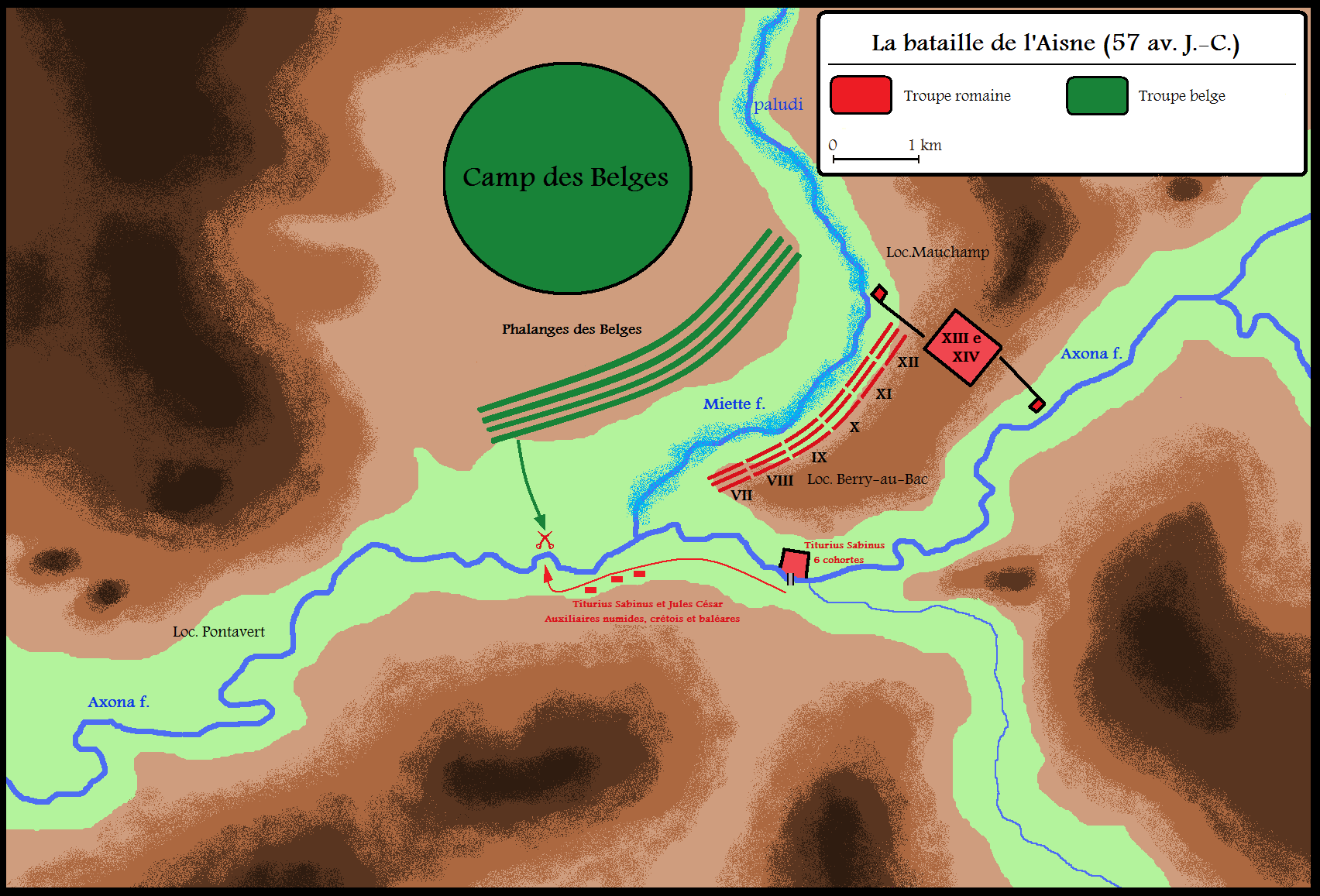
- Army Positions at the Start of the Battle
Date	57 BC
Location	Near modern Aisne, France 49°26′01″N 2°50′49″E
Result	Roman victory

Belligerents
Roman Republic	Belgae

Commanders and leaders
Gaius Julius Caesar; Quintus Titurius Sabinus	Galba of the Suessiones

Strength
About 40,000–45,000 men (8 legions with cavalry and auxiliaries)	At least 50,000 Suessiones, possibly up to the entire Belgic alliance of 288,000

Casualties and losses
Less than 1,000 killed	About 10,000 killed
- Location within France Battle of the Axona (Europe)

The Battle of the Axona was fought in 57 BC, between the Roman army of Gaius Julius Caesar and the Belgae. The Belgae, led by King Galba of the Suessiones, attacked, only to be repelled by Caesar. Fearing an ambush, the Romans delayed their pursuit. Caesar's Commentarii de Bello Gallico describes this battle at 2.7 - 2.11.

== Prelude ==
In the winter of 58–57 BC, Caeser heard rumours that the Belgae tribes were uniting due to their fears of potential Roman involvement in their matters. The union included the Bellovaci, Suessiones, Nervii, Atrebates, Ambiani, Morini, Menapii, Caleti, Veliocasses, Viromandui, Aduatuci, Condrusi, Eburones, Caeroesi, and Paemani tribes, and was under the leadership of Galba, a king of the Suessiones. These reports provided Caesar with a good pretext for conquering more than Gaul "itself", and for this, he raised two legions in Cisalpine Gaul (XIII and XIV) and convinced the Remi tribe to side with him.

In response, the other Belgae and Celtic tribes had attacked Bibrax (the oppidum of the Remi, situated near the river Aisne, then known as the Axona). Caesar entered Remi territory and set up his camp on a hill with his back to the Axona. He sent some skirmishers to assist in the defence of Bibrax.

When the Belgae attempted an assault on the oppidum they saw the Roman skirmishers and realised Caesar was in the area. They quickly gave up on their siege of Bibrax and marched towards the Romans. They encamped their army within two Roman miles of Caesar's camp. Although he was reluctant to give battle at first, some minor cavalry skirmishes between the camps gave Caesar the impression that his men were not inferior to the Belgae, and thus decided on a pitched battle.

== Battle ==
=== Initial phase ===
As Caesar's forces were outnumbered and thus at risk of being out-flanked, he had his army build two trenches, each 400 paces long, one on each side of the plain before the Roman camp. At the end of these trenches, Caesar had small forts built in which he placed his artillery. Then, leaving two legions as a reserve in the camp, he drew up his remaining six in battle order, and the enemy did the same. The crux of the battle lay in the small marsh that was situated between the two armies, and both forces anxiously anticipated the other's crossing of this obstacle, as it was sure to disorder the forces that did so. Cavalry skirmishes began the battle, although neither force crossed the marsh. Caesar claims his forces came out favourably in these initial actions, and so led his forces back to his camp.

=== Second phase: Belgic repositioning and main engagement ===
After Caesar's manoeuver the Belgic forces circumvented the camp and endeavoured to approach it from behind. The rear of the camp was bordered by the river Axona (today called the River Aisne), and the Belgae sought to attack the camp via a single fording spot in the river. Caesar claims their intention was to lead a part of their force over the bridge, and either take the camp by storm, or cut the Romans off from the lands on the opposite side of the river. This tactic would both deprive the Romans of land for foraging, and prevent them from coming to the aid of the Remi tribe whose lands the Belgae had the intention of pillaging (as mentioned in the Prelude, above). To counter this manoeuver, Caesar sent all his light infantry and cavalry to manage the difficult terrain (as it would have been more difficult for the heavy infantry to do so). This action is described in his Gallic Wars at 2.10:

Caesar, being apprized of [the situation] by Titurius [his legate], leads all his cavalry and light-armed Numidians, slingers and archers, over the bridge, and hastens toward them. There was a severe struggle in that place. Our men, attacking in the river the disordered enemy, slew a great part of them. By the immense number of their missiles they drove back the rest, who, in a most courageous manner were attempting to pass over their bodies, and surrounded with their cavalry, and cut to pieces those who had first crossed the river.

Dismayed by the courageous attack by Caesar's men, and by their consequent inability to either take the camp by storm or blockade the Romans from crossing the river, the Belgic forces withdrew to their camp. Then, calling a council of war, they immediately resigned to returning to their home territories, where they might better be able to engage Caesar's invading army.

== Aftermath ==
So rushed and unorganized was the Belgic departure from their camp, that it seemed very much like a panicked retreat to the Roman forces. However, as Caesar was as yet unaware of their reason for departing, he decided not to immediately pursue the forces, for fear of an ambush. The following day, after learning from his scouts of the fully-fledged retreat of the Belgic forces, Caesar sent three legions and all his cavalry to attack the rear of the Belgic marching column. In his account of this action, Caesar claims that these Roman forces killed as many men as the daylight allowed, without any risk to themselves (as the Belgic forces were taken by surprise and breaking rank, sought safety in flight).
