= Rocourt-Saint-Martin =

- Commune
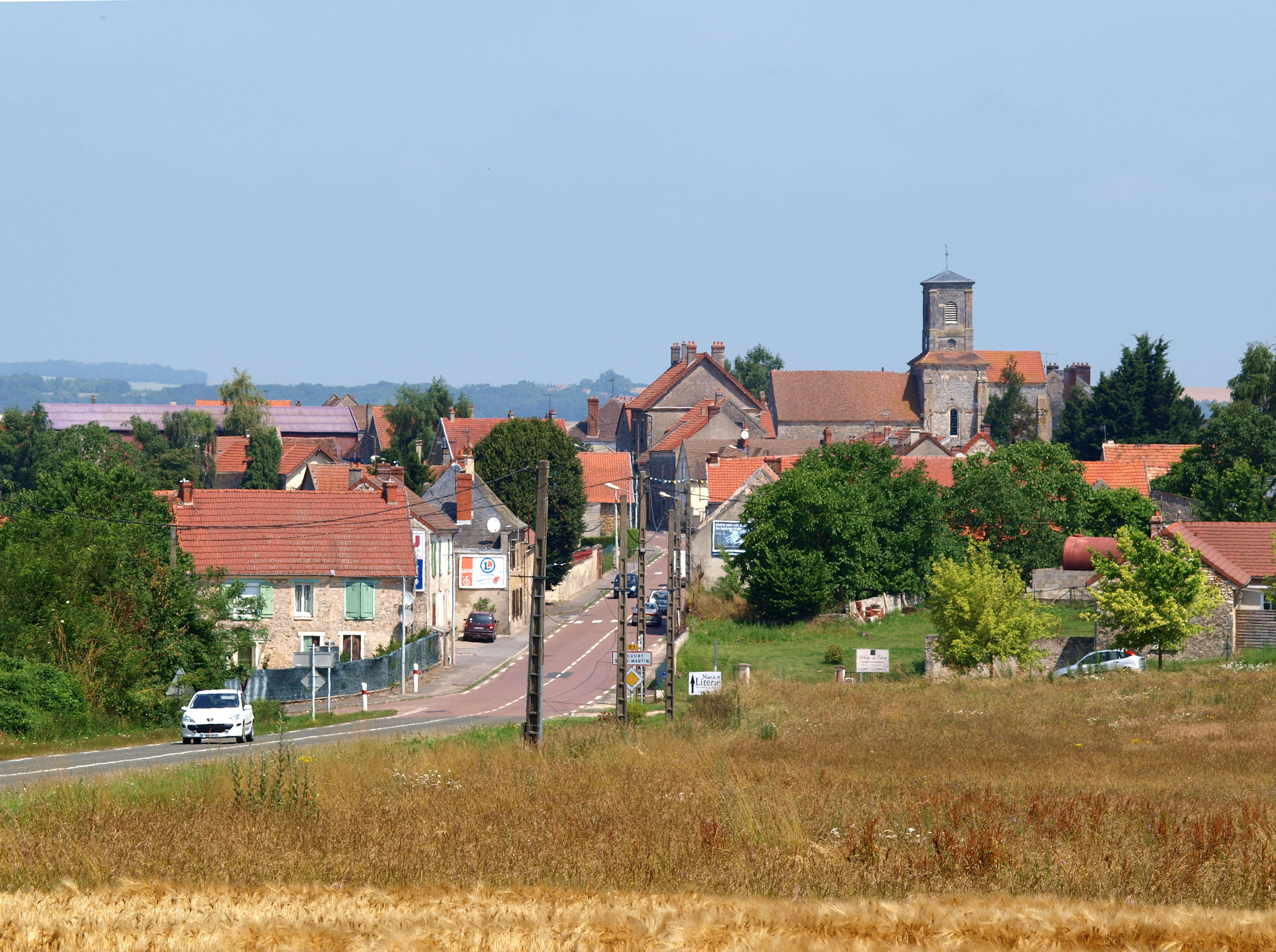
- A general view of Rocourt-Saint-Martin
- Location of Rocourt-Saint-Martin
- Location within France Location within Hauts-de-France
- Coordinates: 49°09′09″N 3°23′17″E
- Country: France
- Region: Hauts-de-France
- Department: Aisne
- Arrondissement: Château-Thierry
- Canton: Château-Thierry
- Intercommunality: CA Région de Château-Thierry

Government
  - Mayor (2026–32): Yves Leveque
- Area^{1}: 5.76 km^{2} (2.22 sq mi)
- Elevation: 135 m (443 ft)
- Highest elevation: 212 m (696 ft)
- Lowest elevation: 109 m (358 ft)
- Population (2023): 299
  - Density: 51.9/km^{2} (134/sq mi)
- Time zone: UTC+01:00 (CET)
  - Summer (DST): UTC+02:00 (CEST)
- INSEE/Postal code: 02649 /02210
- ^{1} French Land Register data, which excludes lakes, ponds, glaciers > 1 km^{2} (0.386 sq mi or 247 acres) and river estuaries.

Rocourt-Saint-Martin (French pronunciation: [ʁɔkuʁ sɛ̃ maʁtɛ̃]) is a commune in the Aisne department in Hauts-de-France in northern France.

== Population ==
Historical population
| Year | Pop. | ±% p.a. |
|---|---|---|
| 1968 | 228 | — |
| 1975 | 190 | −2.57% |
| 1982 | 175 | −1.17% |
| 1990 | 284 | +6.24% |
| 1999 | 295 | +0.42% |
| 2007 | 312 | +0.70% |
| 2012 | 287 | −1.66% |
| 2017 | 289 | +0.14% |
| 2023 | 299 | +0.57% |
Source: INSEE

== See also ==
- Communes of the Aisne department
