= Bézu-Saint-Germain =

- Commune
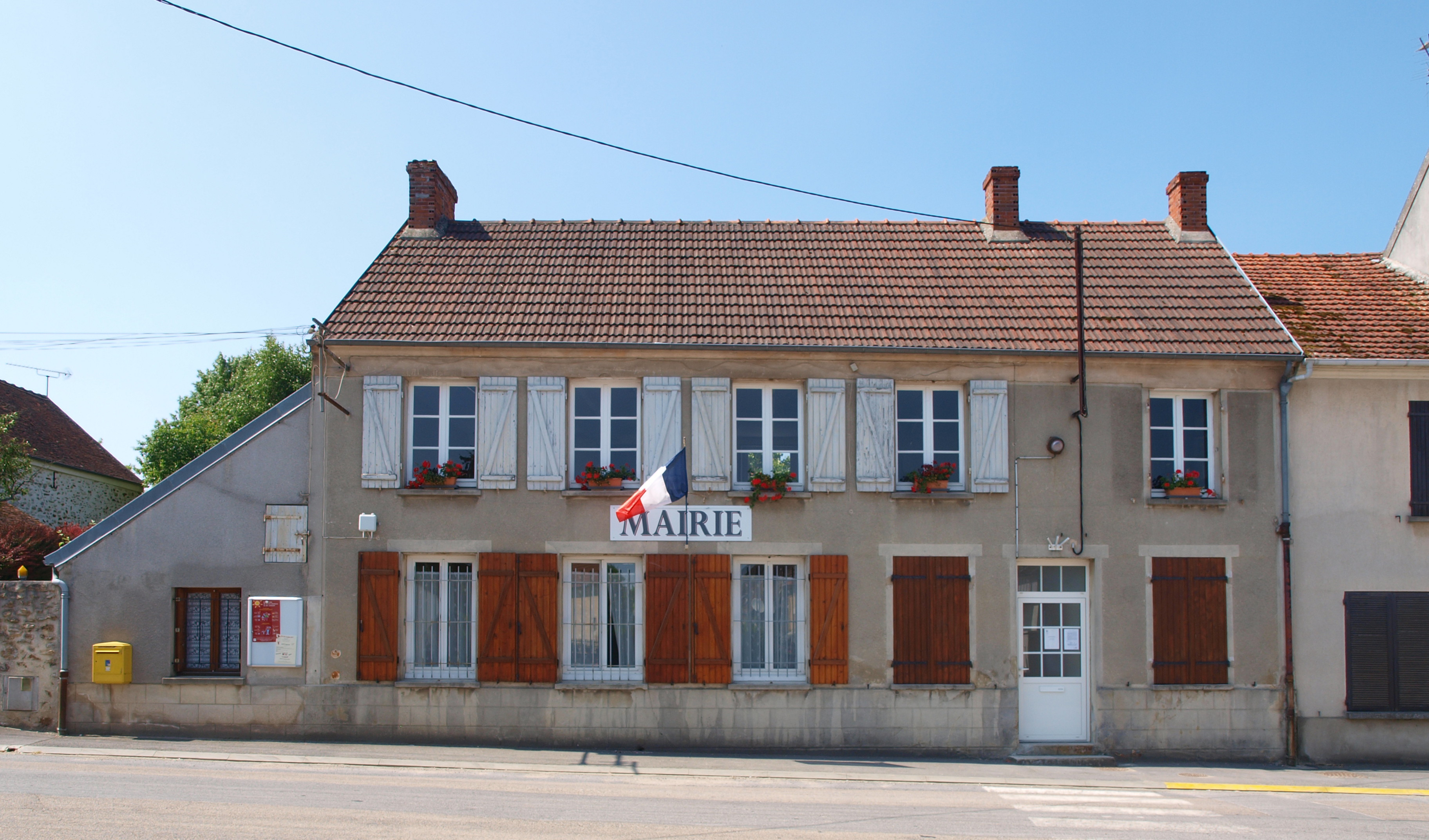
- Town hall
- Location of Bézu-Saint-Germain
- Location within France Location within Hauts-de-France
- Coordinates: 49°06′31″N 3°24′35″E
- Country: France
- Region: Hauts-de-France
- Department: Aisne
- Arrondissement: Château-Thierry
- Canton: Château-Thierry
- Intercommunality: CA Région de Château-Thierry

Government
  - Mayor (2026–32): Virginie Top
- Area^{1}: 11.13 km^{2} (4.30 sq mi)
- Elevation: 210 m (690 ft)
- Highest elevation: 217 m (712 ft)
- Lowest elevation: 129 m (423 ft)
- Population (2023): 991
  - Density: 89.0/km^{2} (231/sq mi)
- Time zone: UTC+01:00 (CET)
  - Summer (DST): UTC+02:00 (CEST)
- INSEE/Postal code: 02085 /02400
- ^{1} French Land Register data, which excludes lakes, ponds, glaciers > 1 km^{2} (0.386 sq mi or 247 acres) and river estuaries.

Bézu-Saint-Germain (French pronunciation: [bezy sɛ̃ ʒɛʁmɛ̃]) is a commune in the department of Aisne in Hauts-de-France in northern France.

== Population ==
Historical population
Year	Pop.	±% p.a.
1968	326	—
1975	275	−2.40%
1982	325	+2.42%
1990	413	+3.04%
1999	477	+1.61%
2007	663	+4.20%
2012	994	+8.44%
2017	1,043	+0.97%
2023	991	−0.85%
Source: INSEE

== See also ==
- Communes of the Aisne department
