= Canton of Château-Thierry =

Coordinates: 49°03′N 3°24′E

Château-Thierry
- Canton
- Interactive map of Château-Thierry
- Country: France
- Region: Hauts-de-France
- Department: Aisne
- No. of communes: {{{nbcomm}}}
- Area: 207.16 km^{2} (79.98 sq mi)
- Population (2023): 27,946
  - Density: 134.90/km^{2} (349.39/sq mi)
- INSEE code: 02 02

The canton of Château-Thierry is an administrative division in northern France. After the French canton reorganisation which came into effect in March 2015, the canton consisted of the following 21 communes:

1. Belleau
2. Bézu-Saint-Germain
3. Blesmes
4. Bouresches
5. Brasles
6. Brécy
7. Château-Thierry
8. Chierry
9. Coincy
10. Épaux-Bézu
11. Épieds
12. Étampes-sur-Marne
13. Étrépilly
14. Fossoy
15. Gland
16. Grisolles
17. Mont-Saint-Père
18. Nesles-la-Montagne
19. Rocourt-Saint-Martin
20. Verdilly
21. Villeneuve-sur-Fère

== Demographics ==
Historical population
Year	Pop.	±% p.a.
2013	26,454	—
2018	28,029	+1.16%
Source: INSEE

== See also ==
- Cantons of the Aisne department
- Communes of France
