= Augusta Suessionum =

Augusta Suessionum was the civitas capital of the Suessiones, a Belgic tribe dwelling in the modern Aisne and Oise regions. Today known as Soissons, the Roman city was founded during the reign of Augustus around 20 BC near their central oppidum, Noviodunum (Pommiers).
