= Nesles-la-Montagne =

- Commune
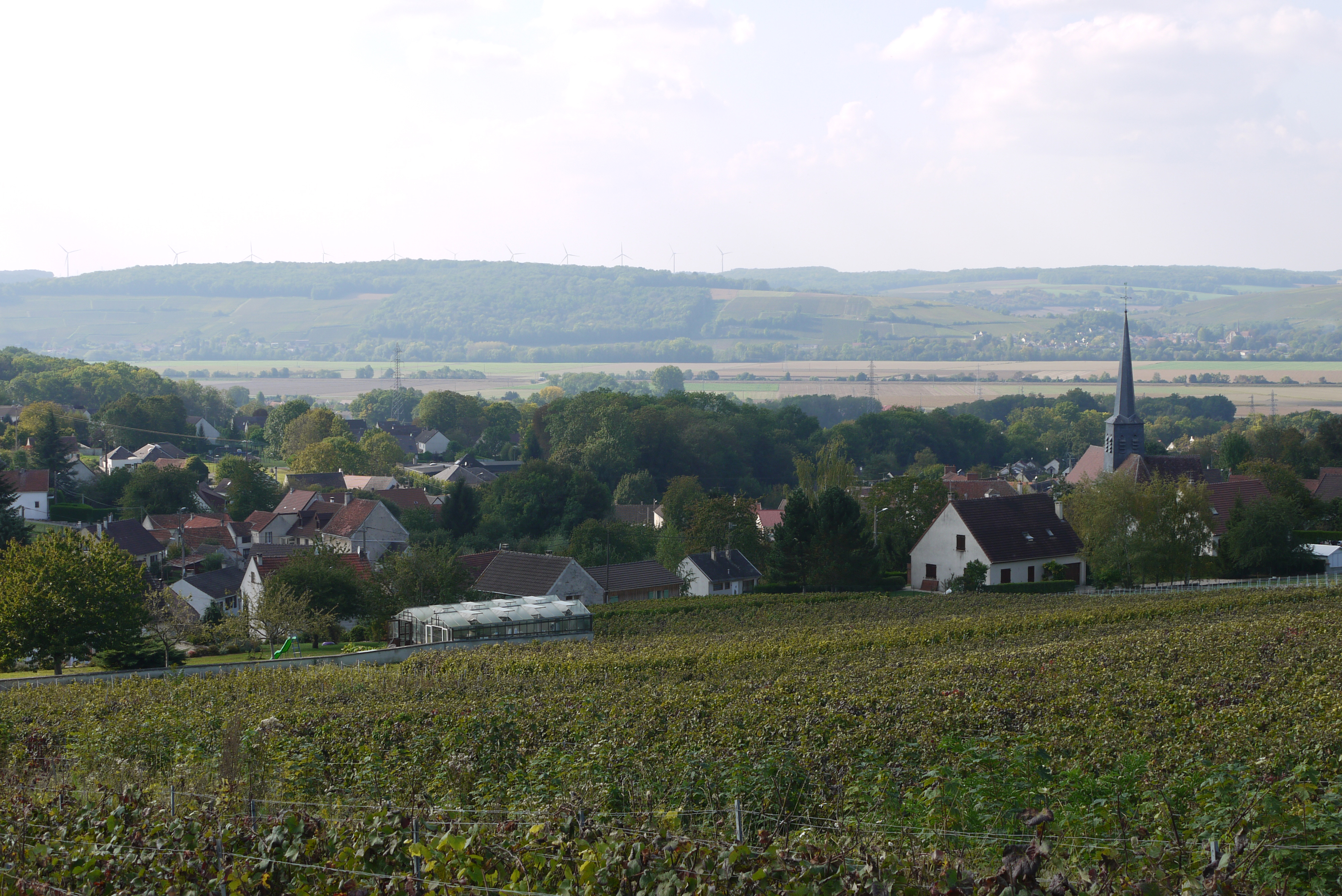
- A general view of Nesles-la-Montagne
- Location of Nesles-la-Montagne
- Location within France Location within Hauts-de-France
- Coordinates: 49°01′13″N 3°25′36″E
- Country: France
- Region: Hauts-de-France
- Department: Aisne
- Arrondissement: Château-Thierry
- Canton: Château-Thierry
- Intercommunality: CA Région de Château-Thierry

Government
  - Mayor (2026–32): Stéphan Amelot
- Area^{1}: 17.21 km^{2} (6.64 sq mi)
- Elevation: 140 m (460 ft)
- Highest elevation: 233 m (764 ft)
- Lowest elevation: 72 m (236 ft)
- Population (2023): 1,189
  - Density: 69.09/km^{2} (178.9/sq mi)
- Time zone: UTC+01:00 (CET)
  - Summer (DST): UTC+02:00 (CEST)
- INSEE/Postal code: 02540 /02400
- ^{1} French Land Register data, which excludes lakes, ponds, glaciers > 1 km^{2} (0.386 sq mi or 247 acres) and river estuaries.

Nesles-la-Montagne (French pronunciation: [nɛl la mɔ̃taɲ]) is a commune in the Aisne department in Hauts-de-France in northern France.

== Population ==
Historical population
Year	Pop.	±% p.a.
1968	511	—
1975	530	+0.52%
1982	883	+7.56%
1990	928	+0.62%
1999	1,073	+1.63%
2007	1,156	+0.94%
2012	1,226	+1.18%
2017	1,230	+0.07%
2023	1,189	−0.56%
Source: INSEE

== See also ==
- Communes of the Aisne department
