= Blesmes =

- Commune
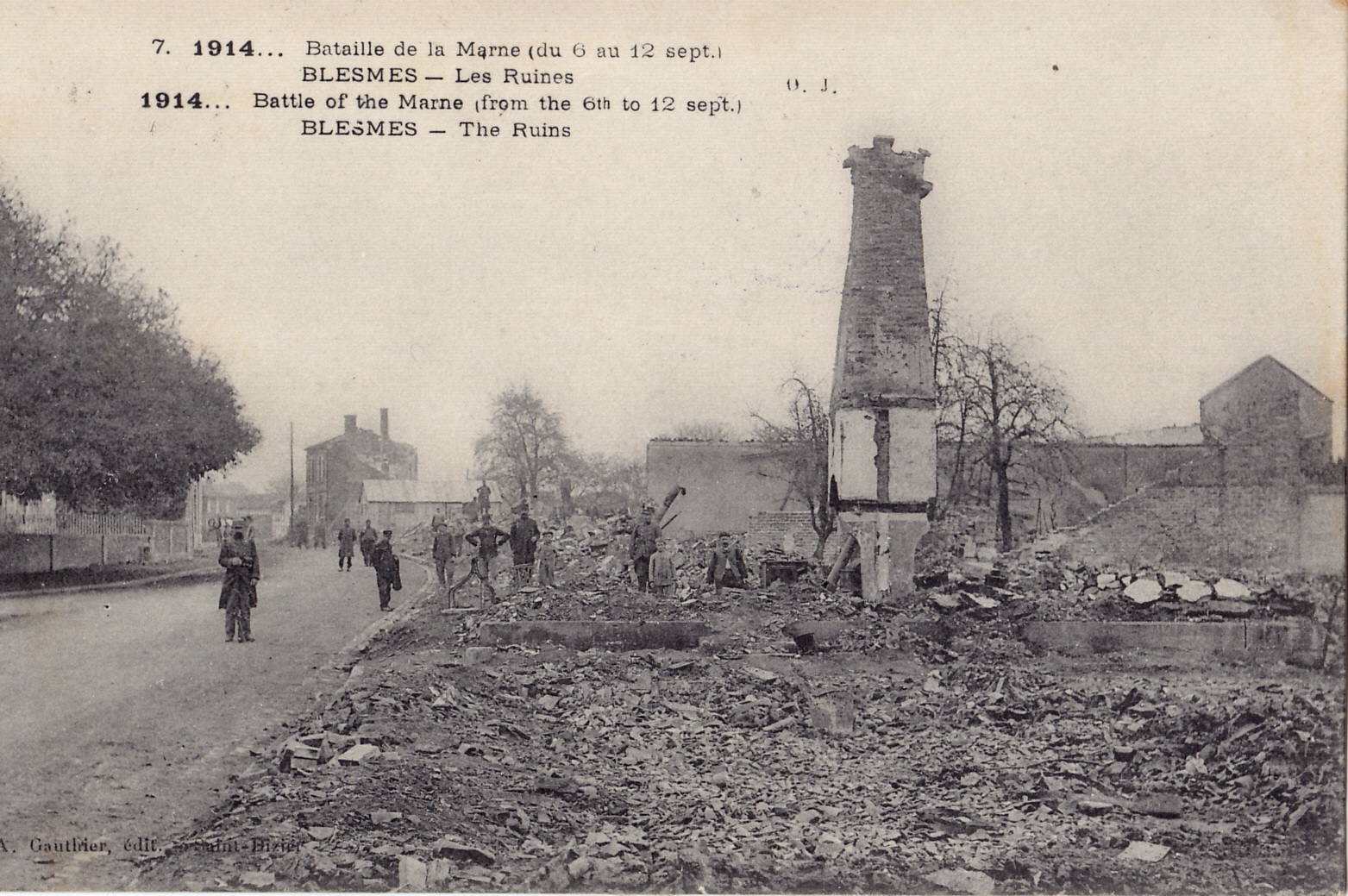
- The destroyed village during the First Battle of the Marne

- Coat of arms
- Location of Blesmes
- Location within France Location within Hauts-de-France
- Coordinates: 49°02′17″N 3°27′06″E
- Country: France
- Region: Hauts-de-France
- Department: Aisne
- Arrondissement: Château-Thierry
- Canton: Château-Thierry
- Intercommunality: CA Région de Château-Thierry

Government
  - Mayor (2026–32): Francis Andre
- Area^{1}: 9.7 km^{2} (3.7 sq mi)
- Elevation: 123 m (404 ft)
- Highest elevation: 231 m (758 ft)
- Lowest elevation: 61 m (200 ft)
- Population (2023): 474
  - Density: 49/km^{2} (130/sq mi)
- Time zone: UTC+01:00 (CET)
  - Summer (DST): UTC+02:00 (CEST)
- INSEE/Postal code: 02094 /02400
- ^{1} French Land Register data, which excludes lakes, ponds, glaciers > 1 km^{2} (0.386 sq mi or 247 acres) and river estuaries.

Blesmes (French pronunciation: [blɛm]) is a commune in the department of Aisne in Hauts-de-France in northern France.

== Population ==
Historical population
Year	Pop.	±% p.a.
1968	232	—
1975	274	+2.41%
1982	352	+3.64%
1990	339	−0.47%
1999	381	+1.31%
2007	379	−0.07%
2012	396	+0.88%
2017	447	+2.45%
2023	474	+0.98%
Source: INSEE

== See also ==
- Communes of the Aisne department
