= Étrépilly, Aisne =

Étrépilly
- Commune
- Location of Étrépilly
- Location within France Location within Hauts-de-France
- Coordinates: 49°05′08″N 3°20′23″E
- Country: France
- Region: Hauts-de-France
- Department: Aisne
- Arrondissement: Château-Thierry
- Canton: Château-Thierry
- Intercommunality: CA Région de Château-Thierry

Government
  - Mayor (2026–32): Jean-Pierre Polin
- Area^{1}: 5.13 km^{2} (1.98 sq mi)
- Elevation: 195 m (640 ft)
- Highest elevation: 222 m (728 ft)
- Lowest elevation: 131 m (430 ft)
- Population (2023): 125
  - Density: 24.4/km^{2} (63.1/sq mi)
- Time zone: UTC+01:00 (CET)
  - Summer (DST): UTC+02:00 (CEST)
- INSEE/Postal code: 02297 /02400
- ^{1} French Land Register data, which excludes lakes, ponds, glaciers > 1 km^{2} (0.386 sq mi or 247 acres) and river estuaries.

Étrépilly is a commune in the Aisne department in Hauts-de-France in northern France.

== Population ==
Historical population
Year	Pop.	±% p.a.
1968	107	—
1975	70	−5.88%
1982	87	+3.15%
1990	87	+0.00%
1999	85	−0.26%
2007	87	+0.29%
2012	91	+0.90%
2017	118	+5.33%
2023	125	+0.97%
Source: INSEE

== See also ==
- Communes of the Aisne department
