= Ressons-le-Long =

- Commune
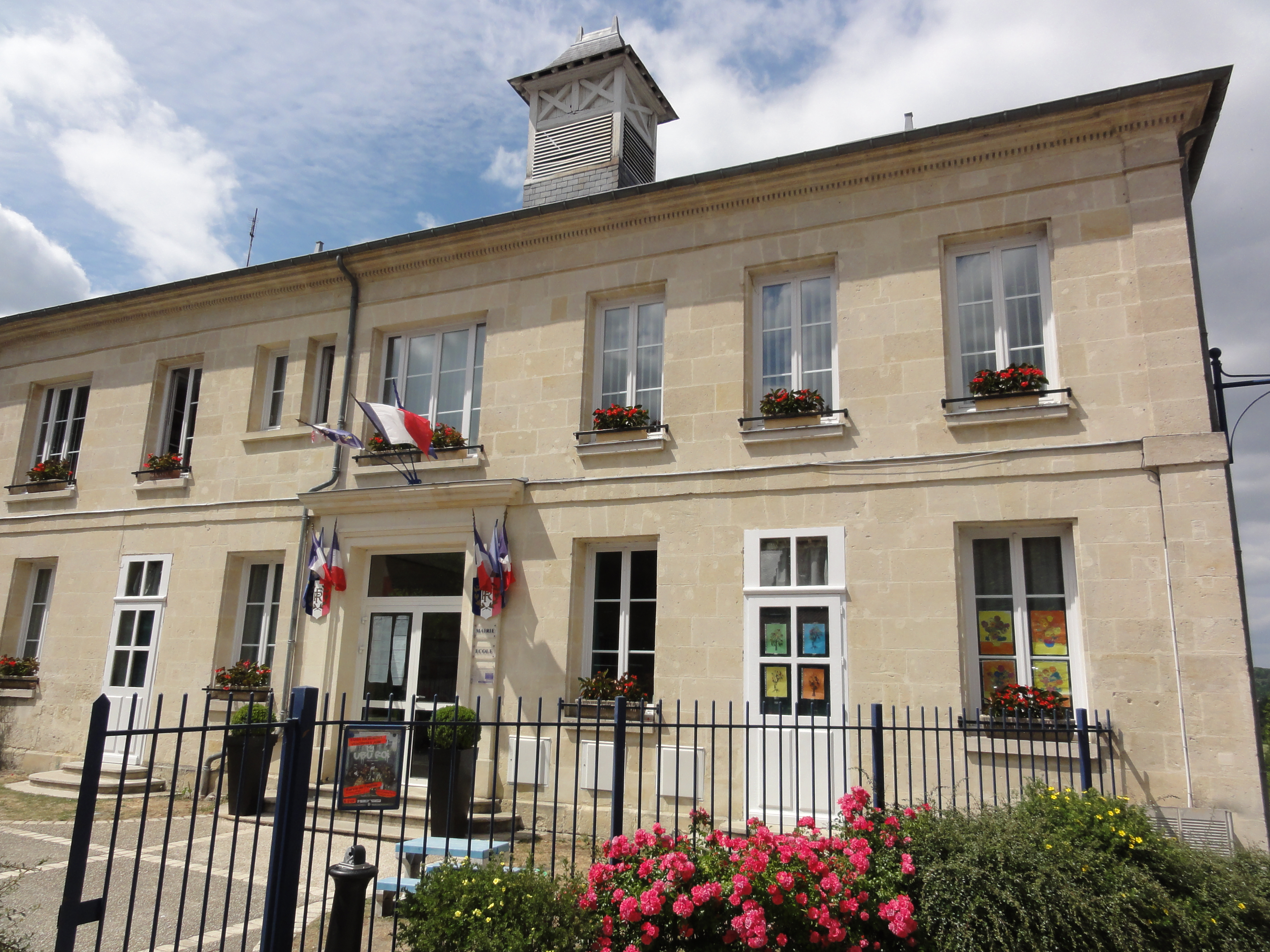
- The town hall and school of Ressons-le-Long

- Coat of arms
- Location of Ressons-le-Long
- Location within France Location within Hauts-de-France
- Coordinates: 49°23′20″N 3°08′58″E
- Country: France
- Region: Hauts-de-France
- Department: Aisne
- Arrondissement: Soissons
- Canton: Vic-sur-Aisne

Government
  - Mayor (2026–32): Frédéric Douchet
- Area^{1}: 10.55 km^{2} (4.07 sq mi)
- Elevation: 72 m (236 ft)
- Highest elevation: 150 m (490 ft)
- Lowest elevation: 37 m (121 ft)
- Population (2023): 790
  - Density: 75/km^{2} (190/sq mi)
- Time zone: UTC+01:00 (CET)
  - Summer (DST): UTC+02:00 (CEST)
- INSEE/Postal code: 02643 /02290
- ^{1} French Land Register data, which excludes lakes, ponds, glaciers > 1 km^{2} (0.386 sq mi or 247 acres) and river estuaries.

Ressons-le-Long (French pronunciation: [ʁəsɔ̃ lə lɔ̃]) is a commune in the Aisne department in Hauts-de-France in northern France.

== Population ==
Historical population
Year	Pop.	±% p.a.
1968	652	—
1975	692	+0.85%
1982	698	+0.12%
1990	711	+0.23%
1999	740	+0.45%
2007	760	+0.33%
2012	771	+0.29%
2017	772	+0.03%
2023	790	+0.38%
Source: INSEE

== See also ==
- Communes of the Aisne department
