= Mametz =

Mametz may refer to:

- Mametz, Pas-de-Calais, France
- Mametz, Somme, France
