= Fossoy =

- Commune
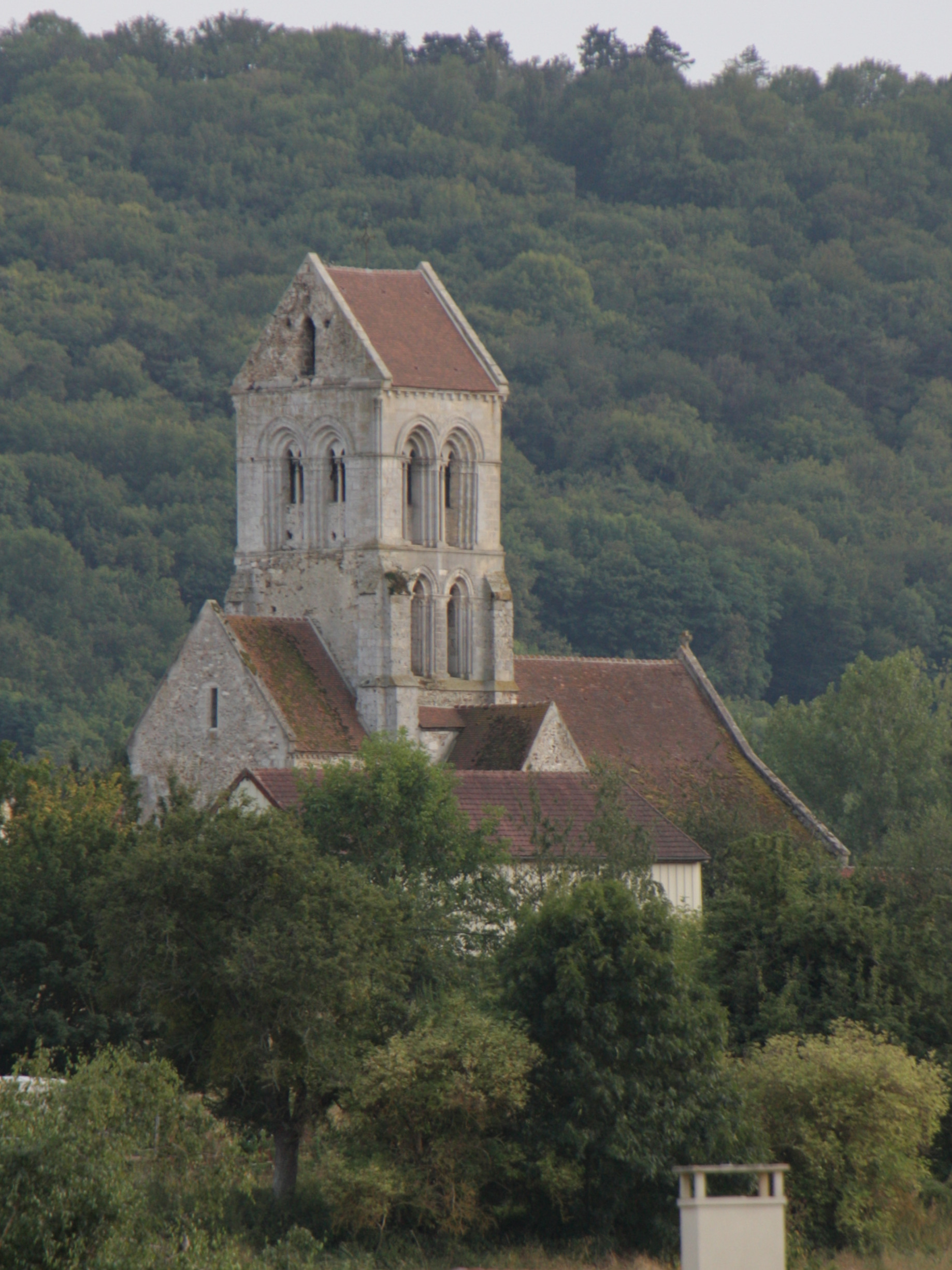
- The church of Fossoy
- Location of Fossoy
- Location within France Location within Hauts-de-France
- Coordinates: 49°02′57″N 3°29′00″E
- Country: France
- Region: Hauts-de-France
- Department: Aisne
- Arrondissement: Château-Thierry
- Canton: Château-Thierry
- Intercommunality: CA Région de Château-Thierry

Government
  - Mayor (2026–32): Hervé Leduc
- Area^{1}: 7.18 km^{2} (2.77 sq mi)
- Elevation: 100 m (330 ft)
- Highest elevation: 234 m (768 ft)
- Lowest elevation: 61 m (200 ft)
- Population (2023): 535
  - Density: 74.5/km^{2} (193/sq mi)
- Time zone: UTC+01:00 (CET)
  - Summer (DST): UTC+02:00 (CEST)
- INSEE/Postal code: 02328 /02650
- ^{1} French Land Register data, which excludes lakes, ponds, glaciers > 1 km^{2} (0.386 sq mi or 247 acres) and river estuaries.

Fossoy (French pronunciation: [fɔswa]) is a commune in the Aisne department in Hauts-de-France in northern France.

== Population ==
Historical population
Year	Pop.	±% p.a.
1968	370	—
1975	463	+3.26%
1982	517	+1.59%
1990	621	+2.32%
1999	620	−0.02%
2007	591	−0.60%
2012	565	−0.90%
2017	524	−1.50%
2023	535	+0.35%
Source: INSEE

== See also ==
- Communes of the Aisne department
