= Diviciacus (Suessiones) =

King of the Suessiones
- Succeeded by: Galba?

Personal details
- Died: c. 1st century BC Belgic confederation
- Occupation: Aristocrat; Politician

Diviciacus (ruled c. 80 BC) was a king of the Suessiones, a Belgic tribe that resided in the Aisne and Oise departments of present-day France, sometime in the early 1st century BC. In his writings, Julius Caesar claimed that Diviciacus had been the most powerful king in Gaul within living memory, ruling a large portion of Belgica and Britain.

== Biography ==
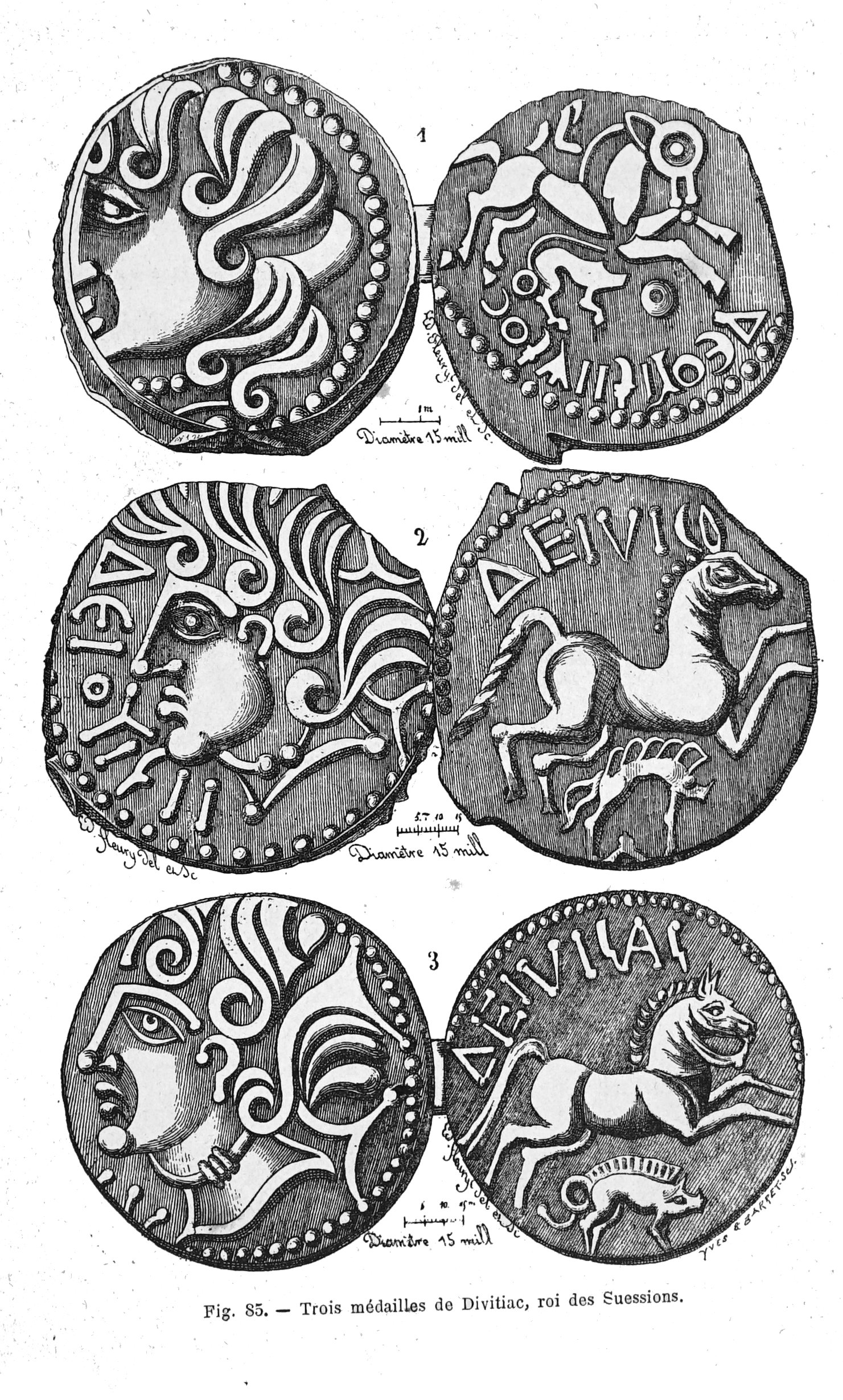
Suessionean coins bearing the name of Diviciacus.

Diviciacus is mentioned briefly in Julius Caesar's Commentarii de Bello Gallico where he is claimed by members of the Remi tribe to have ruled as king of the neighboring Suessiones within living memory. The Suessiones were a Gallic tribe who resided between the Oise and Marne rivers during the Late Iron Age and belonged to a large confederation of Celto-Germanic tribes known as the Belgae. They possessed close cultural and political ties to the Remi with which they shared laws and magistrates.

Caesar also states that under the rule of Diviciacus, the power of the Suessiones was so great that they exerted influence over the majority of other Belgic tribes and even a portion of southeastern Britain. For these feats, Caesar describes him as having been "the most powerful man in the whole of Gaul".

== Etymology ==
The meaning of the name Diviciacus in the Gaulish language is uncertain. Delamarre proposes that the root *Divic- is a calque of the Latin devinco ("to defeat, conquer") and interprets the name as meaning "the avenger". However, the name is also attested among the Aedui as the name of Diviciacus, brother of Dumnorix, who is also referred to as Divitiacus in some sources, offering a potential alternative form of the name.

Bronze coins found in the territory of the Suessiones appear to bear the name of Diviciacus written using the Greek alphabet and have been variously interpreted as deioutiakos or deioykiiakoc.

== Bibliography ==
- Schön, Franz (2006). "Suessiones". Brill's New Pauly. doi:10.1163/1574-9347_bnp_e1125110.
