= Brécy, Aisne =

Brécy
- Commune
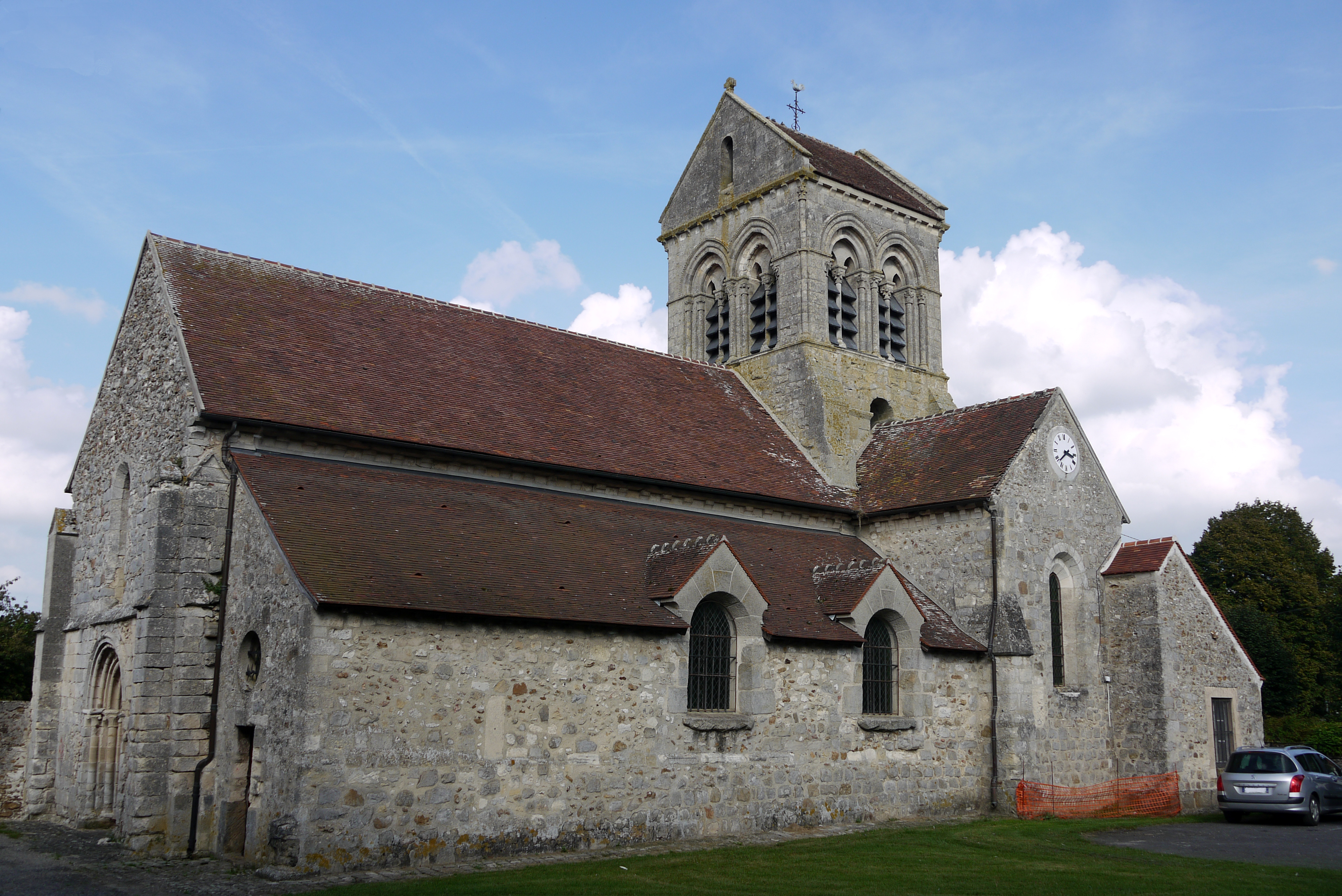
- The church of Brécy
- Location of Brécy
- Location within France Location within Hauts-de-France
- Coordinates: 49°08′55″N 3°25′49″E
- Country: France
- Region: Hauts-de-France
- Department: Aisne
- Arrondissement: Château-Thierry
- Canton: Château-Thierry
- Intercommunality: CA Région de Château-Thierry

Government
  - Mayor (2026–32): Vincent Varnier
- Area^{1}: 9.98 km^{2} (3.85 sq mi)
- Elevation: 130 m (430 ft)
- Highest elevation: 216 m (709 ft)
- Lowest elevation: 103 m (338 ft)
- Population (2023): 317
  - Density: 31.8/km^{2} (82.3/sq mi)
- Time zone: UTC+01:00 (CET)
  - Summer (DST): UTC+02:00 (CEST)
- INSEE/Postal code: 02119 /02210
- ^{1} French Land Register data, which excludes lakes, ponds, glaciers > 1 km^{2} (0.386 sq mi or 247 acres) and river estuaries.

Brécy (French pronunciation: [bʁesi]) is a commune in the department of Aisne in Hauts-de-France in northern France.

== Points of Interest ==
- Saint-Michel Church from the 12th century, Monument historique since 1920
- The castle of Le Buisson from the 13th century, Monument historique since 1981
- Engraved rock from the 5th century, Monument historique since 1975 (Rocher gravé de Brécy)
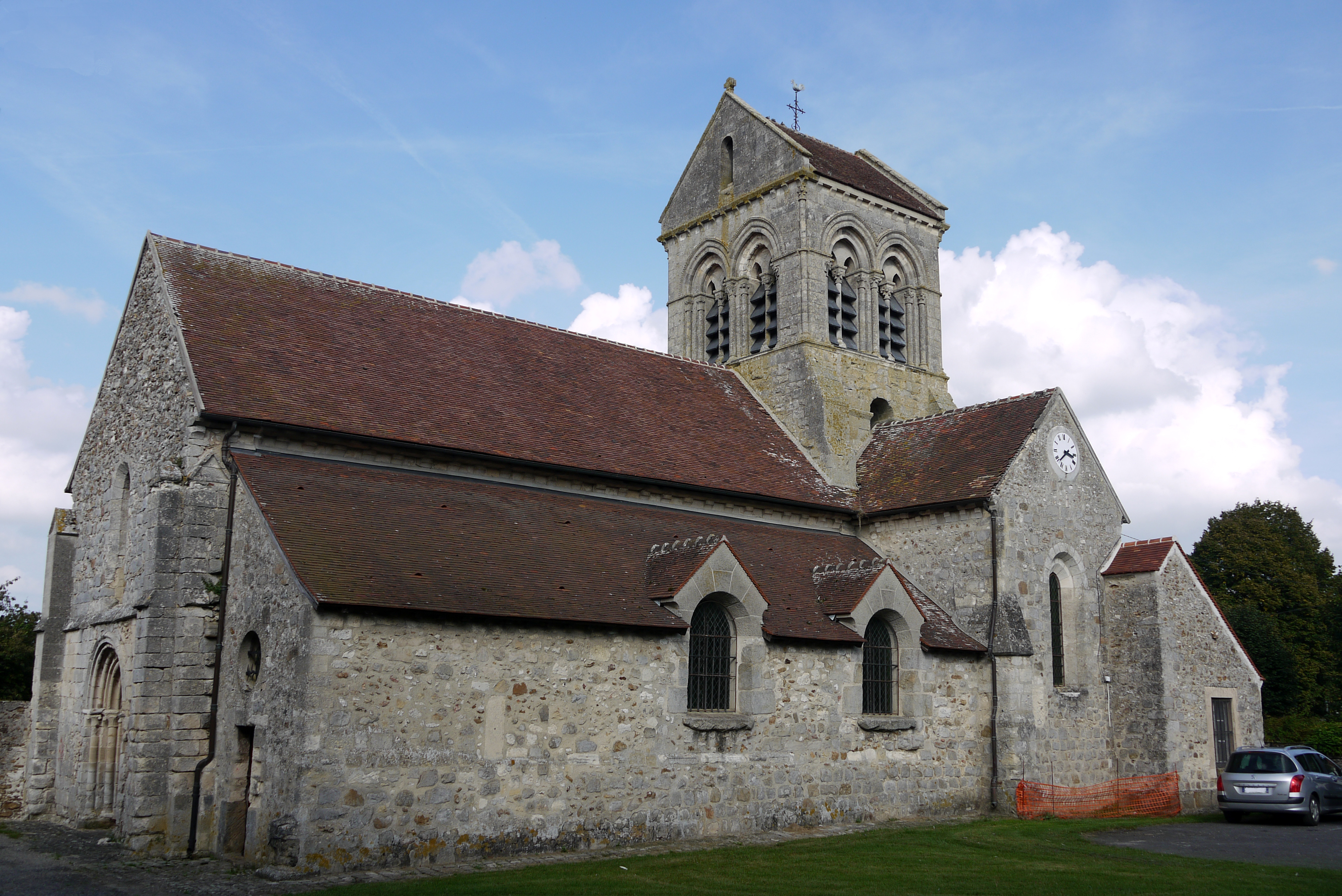
  Saint Michel Church
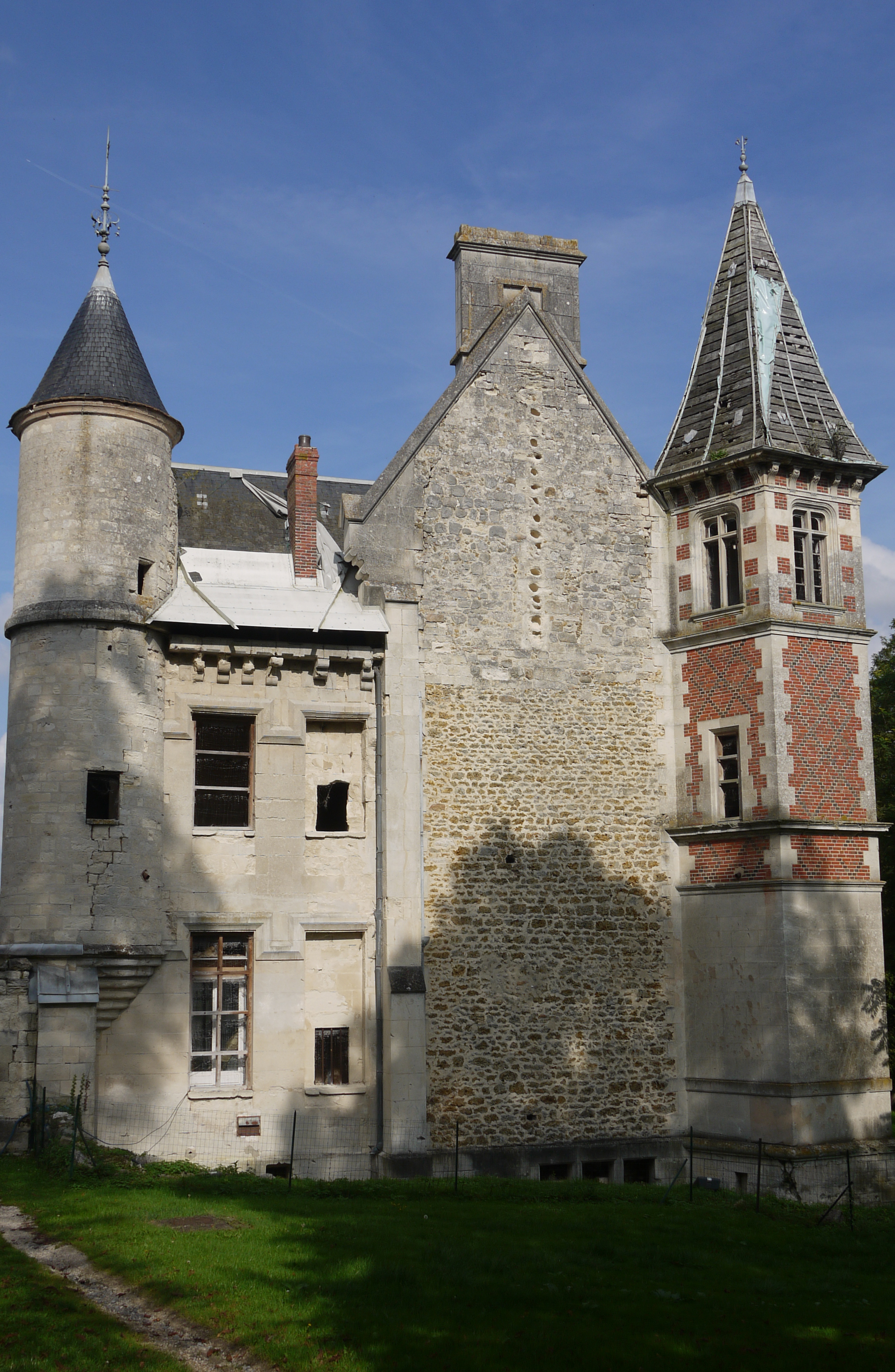
  Castle of Le Buisson
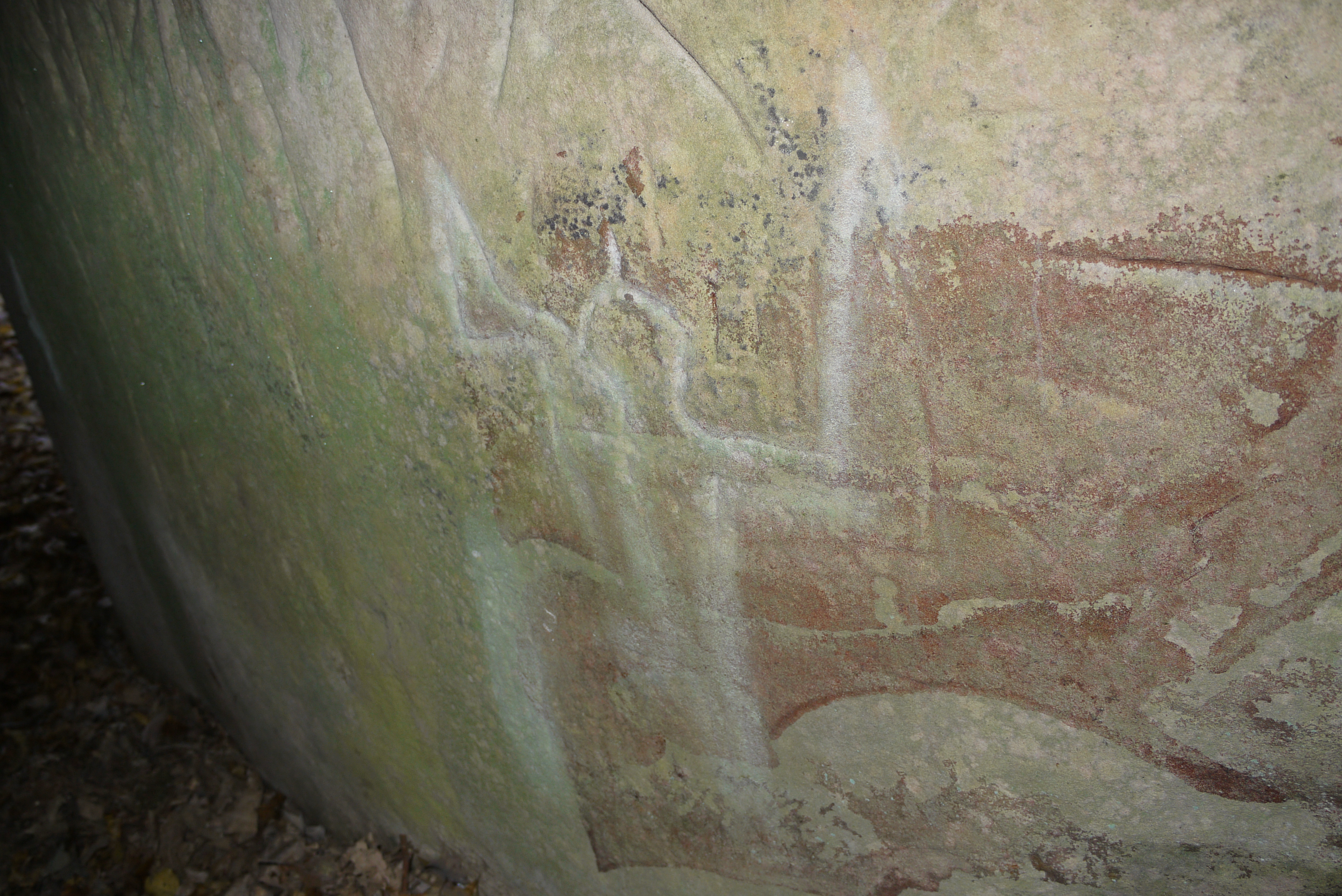
  Engraved Rock

== Population ==
Historical population
Year	Pop.	±% p.a.
1968	215	—
1975	224	+0.59%
1982	183	−2.85%
1990	284	+5.65%
1999	318	+1.26%
2007	335	+0.65%
2012	354	+1.11%
2017	340	−0.80%
2023	317	−1.16%
Source: INSEE

== See also ==
- Communes of the Aisne department
