= Verdilly =

- Commune
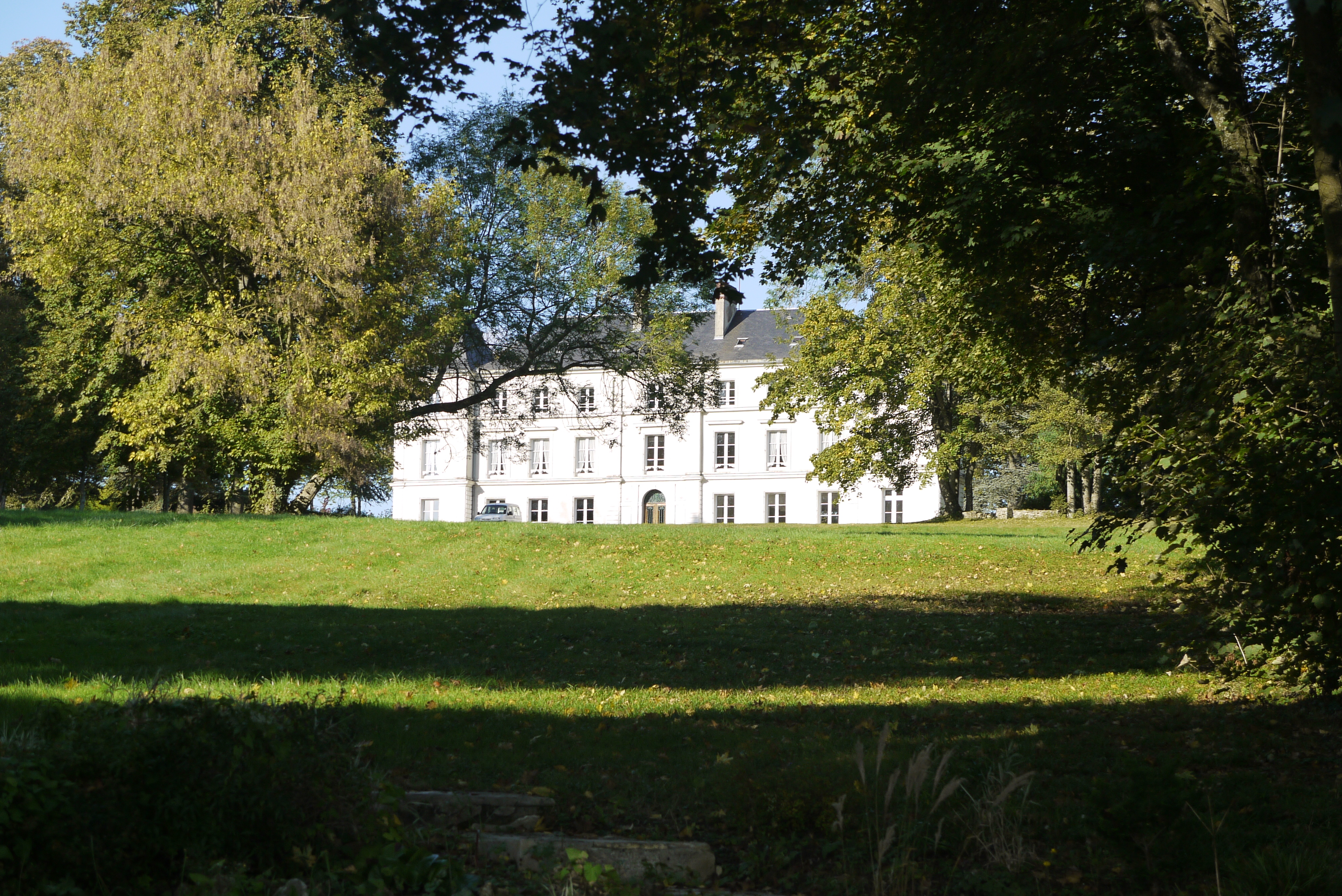
- The chateau of Verdilly
- Location of Verdilly
- Location within France Location within Hauts-de-France
- Coordinates: 49°04′24″N 3°25′29″E
- Country: France
- Region: Hauts-de-France
- Department: Aisne
- Arrondissement: Château-Thierry
- Canton: Château-Thierry
- Intercommunality: CA Région de Château-Thierry

Government
  - Mayor (2026–32): Gilles Jourdain
- Area^{1}: 5.1 km^{2} (2.0 sq mi)
- Elevation: 121 m (397 ft)
- Highest elevation: 221 m (725 ft)
- Lowest elevation: 85 m (279 ft)
- Population (2023): 443
  - Density: 87/km^{2} (220/sq mi)
- Time zone: UTC+01:00 (CET)
  - Summer (DST): UTC+02:00 (CEST)
- INSEE/Postal code: 02781 /02400
- ^{1} French Land Register data, which excludes lakes, ponds, glaciers > 1 km^{2} (0.386 sq mi or 247 acres) and river estuaries.

Verdilly is a commune in the Aisne department in Hauts-de-France in northern France.

== Population ==
Historical population
Year	Pop.	±% p.a.
1968	231	—
1975	230	−0.06%
1982	263	+1.93%
1990	386	+4.91%
1999	424	+1.05%
2007	428	+0.12%
2012	442	+0.65%
2017	461	+0.85%
2023	443	−0.66%
Source: INSEE

== See also ==
- Communes of the Aisne department
