= Grisolles, Aisne =

Grisolles
- Commune
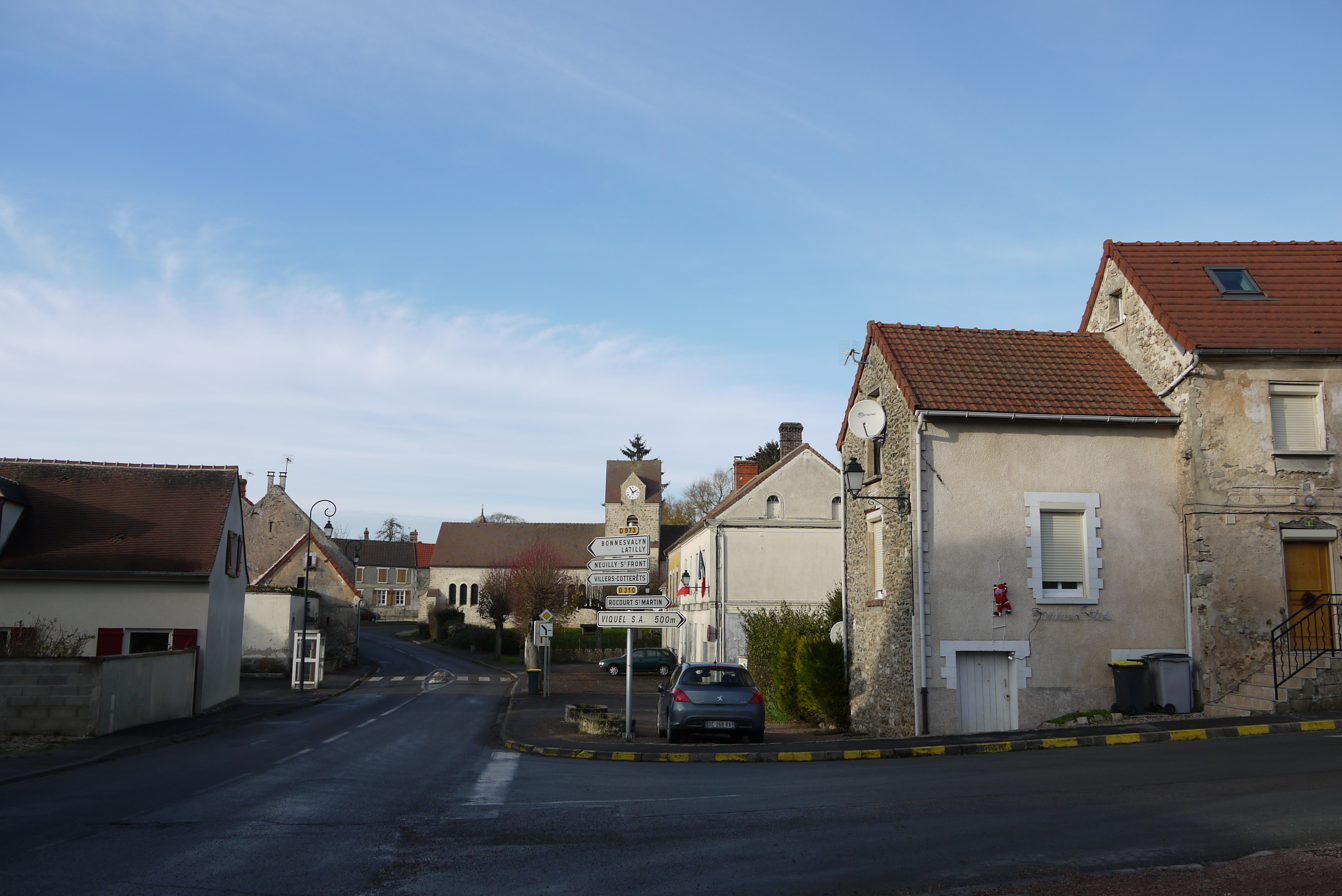
- The main road of Grisolles
- Location of Grisolles
- Location within France Location within Hauts-de-France
- Coordinates: 49°08′29″N 3°21′30″E
- Country: France
- Region: Hauts-de-France
- Department: Aisne
- Arrondissement: Château-Thierry
- Canton: Château-Thierry
- Intercommunality: CA Région de Château-Thierry

Government
  - Mayor (2026–32): Clément Paradowski
- Area^{1}: 10.63 km^{2} (4.10 sq mi)
- Elevation: 160 m (520 ft)
- Highest elevation: 212 m (696 ft)
- Lowest elevation: 125 m (410 ft)
- Population (2023): 227
  - Density: 21.4/km^{2} (55.3/sq mi)
- Time zone: UTC+01:00 (CET)
  - Summer (DST): UTC+02:00 (CEST)
- INSEE/Postal code: 02356 /02210
- ^{1} French Land Register data, which excludes lakes, ponds, glaciers > 1 km^{2} (0.386 sq mi or 247 acres) and river estuaries.

Grisolles (French pronunciation: [ɡʁizɔl]) is a commune in the Aisne department in Hauts-de-France in northern France.

== Population ==
Historical population
Year	Pop.	±% p.a.
1968	137	—
1975	125	−1.30%
1982	116	−1.06%
1990	152	+3.44%
1999	159	+0.50%
2007	200	+2.91%
2012	189	−1.13%
2017	252	+5.92%
2023	227	−1.73%
Source: INSEE

== See also ==
- Communes of the Aisne department
