= Meldi =

Ancient Gallic tribe

The Meldi were a Gallic tribe living in the region of modern Meaux (Seine-et-Marne) during the Iron Age and the Roman period.

== Name ==
They are attested as Meldi by Caesar (mid-1st c. BC)., as Méldoi (Μέλδοι) by Strabo (early 1st c. AD), Meldi liberi by Pliny (1st c. AD), Méldai (Μέλδαι; var. Μέλγαι) by Ptolemy (2nd c. AD), and as Ciuitas Melduorum (var. meldorum) in the Notitia Dignitatum (5th c. AD).

The etymology of Meldi is unclear. Pierre-Yves Lambert compared it to Old Irish meld ('sweet, pleasant, agreeable'), with an u-stem meldu- possibly preserved in the late form Melduorum. Alternatively, John T. Koch has proposed to derive it from a stem *meldh- ('lightning') attested in Welsh mellt ('lightning, thunderbolts'), and possibly in Gaulish Meldio, an epithet of Loucetios. Depending on the interpretation, the ethnic name may be translated as the 'lightening people' or the 'sweet people'.

The city of Meaux, attested as Meldorum civitas c. 400 AD (Meldis in the 7th c. AD, Miaux in 1275), is named after the tribe.

== Geography ==
The Meldi lived along the Marne river, east of Lutetia (modern Paris).

They were likely clients of the most powerful Suessiones.

== History ==
During the Gallic Wars (58–50 BC), Caesar had sixty ships built among them for the expedition to the island of Britain in 51 BC.
