= Épaux-Bézu =

- Commune
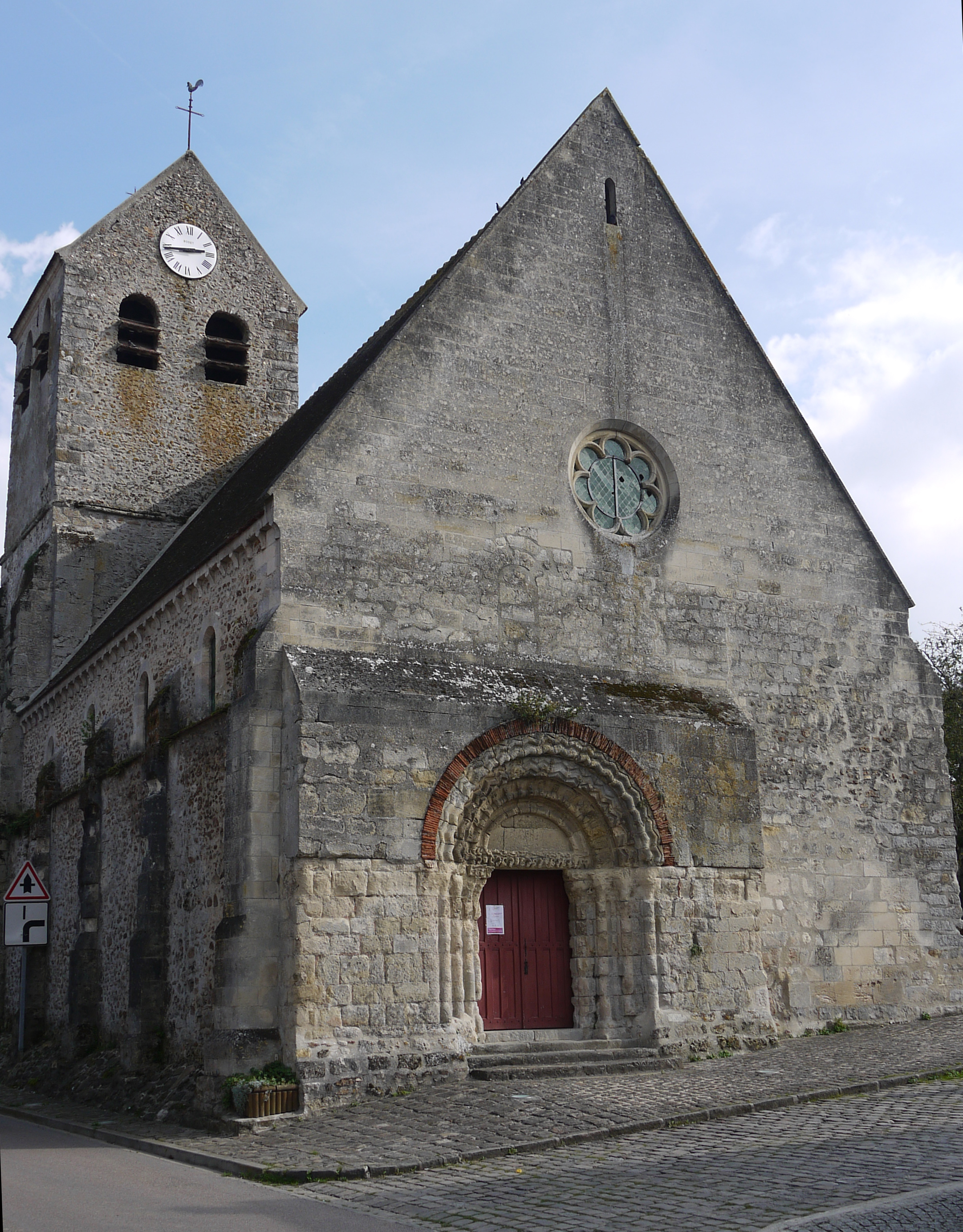
- The church of Épaux-Bézu
- Location of Épaux-Bézu
- Location within France Location within Hauts-de-France
- Coordinates: 49°06′33″N 3°20′54″E
- Country: France
- Region: Hauts-de-France
- Department: Aisne
- Arrondissement: Château-Thierry
- Canton: Château-Thierry
- Intercommunality: CA Région de Château-Thierry

Government
  - Mayor (2026–32): Étienne Haÿ
- Area^{1}: 19.5 km^{2} (7.5 sq mi)
- Elevation: 125 m (410 ft)
- Highest elevation: 217 m (712 ft)
- Lowest elevation: 100 m (330 ft)
- Population (2023): 534
  - Density: 27.4/km^{2} (70.9/sq mi)
- Time zone: UTC+01:00 (CET)
  - Summer (DST): UTC+02:00 (CEST)
- INSEE/Postal code: 02279 /02400
- ^{1} French Land Register data, which excludes lakes, ponds, glaciers > 1 km^{2} (0.386 sq mi or 247 acres) and river estuaries.

Épaux-Bézu (French pronunciation: [epo bezy]) is a commune in the Aisne department in Hauts-de-France in northern France.

== Population ==
Historical population
Year	Pop.	±% p.a.
1968	316	—
1975	276	−1.91%
1982	334	+2.76%
1990	433	+3.30%
1999	534	+2.36%
2007	560	+0.60%
2012	583	+0.81%
2017	556	−0.94%
2023	534	−0.67%
Source: INSEE

== Geography ==
Épaux-Bézu is located about ten kilometers north of Château-Thierry, near the A4 motorway and the D1.

== See also ==
- Communes of the Aisne department
