= Escadrille Spa.163 =

- Active: 1918
- Country: France
- Branch: French Air Service
- Type: Fighter Squadron

Escadrille Spa.163 was a French fighter squadron founded on 11 April 1918 as a replacement squadron for the American 103rd Aero Squadron. By 11 November 1918, the escadrille had been credited with 25 aerial victories.

== History ==
Escadrille Spa.163 was formed on 11 April 1918, equipped with SPAD fighters. Although it was a French squadron, it had some American pilots who remained in French service instead of being repatriated to American squadrons. The escadrille was formed as a replacement for the American 103rd Aero Squadron, which was being withdrawn from Groupe de Combat 21. Escadrille Spa.163 took the 103rd Aero's place in the Groupe, and consequently moved and fought as part of it. At various dates, the Groupe supported either IV Armee or VI Armee. By the 11 November 1918 Armistice, Escadrille Spa.163 was credited with shooting down 25 German aircraft.

== Commanding officers ==
- Capitaine Henri Nompere de Champagny: 11 April 1918 - unknown
- Lieutenant Louis Verdier-Fauvety: Unknown - killed in bombing 21 August 1918
- Unknown: 21 August 1918 - 11 November 1918

== Notable members ==
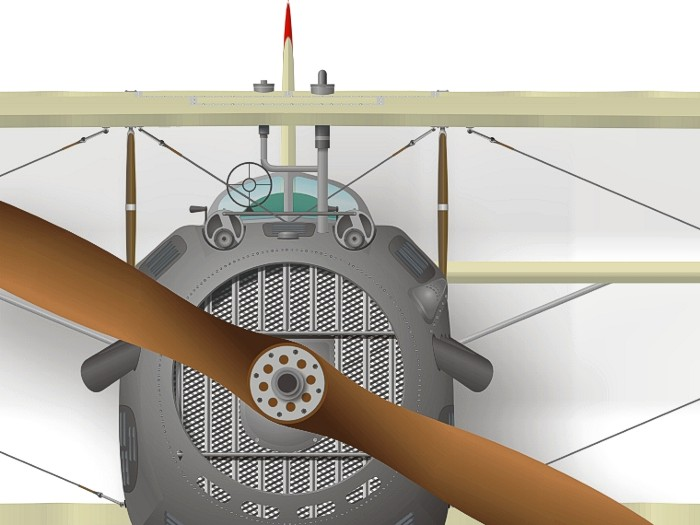
Front view of a SPAD XIII, favored mount of ace James Connelly.

- Captain Thomas Cassady
- Adjutant James Connelly

== Aircraft ==
- 15 SPAD fighters: 11 April 1918
