= Canton of Charly-sur-Marne =

Coordinates: 48°58′N 3°16′E

Charly
- Former canton
- Interactive map of Charly
- Country: France
- Region: Hauts-de-France
- Department: Aisne
- No. of communes: {{{nbcomm}}}
- Disbanded: 2015
- Area: 212.08 km^{2} (81.88 sq mi)
- Population (2012): 14,881
  - Density: 70.167/km^{2} (181.73/sq mi)

The canton of Charly-sur-Marne is a former administrative division in northern France. It was disbanded following the French canton reorganisation which came into effect in March 2015. It consisted of 19 communes, which joined the new canton of Essômes-sur-Marne in 2015. It had 14,881 inhabitants (2012).

The canton comprised the following communes:

- Bézu-le-Guéry
- La Chapelle-sur-Chézy
- Charly-sur-Marne
- Chézy-sur-Marne
- Coupru
- Crouttes-sur-Marne
- Domptin
- L'Épine-aux-Bois
- Essises
- Lucy-le-Bocage
- Montfaucon
- Montreuil-aux-Lions
- Nogent-l'Artaud
- Pavant
- Romeny-sur-Marne
- Saulchery
- Vendières
- Viels-Maisons
- Villiers-Saint-Denis

== Demographics ==
Historical population Canton of Charly-sur-Marne
Year	1962	1968	1975	1982	1990	1999
Pop.	8,846	9,551	9,803	10,884	12,405	13,712
±%	—	+8.0%	+2.6%	+11.0%	+14.0%	+10.5%
From the year 1962 on: No double counting – residents of multiple communes (e.g. students and military personnel) are counted only once. Source: INSEE

== See also ==
- Cantons of the Aisne department
