= Passy-sur-Marne =

- Commune
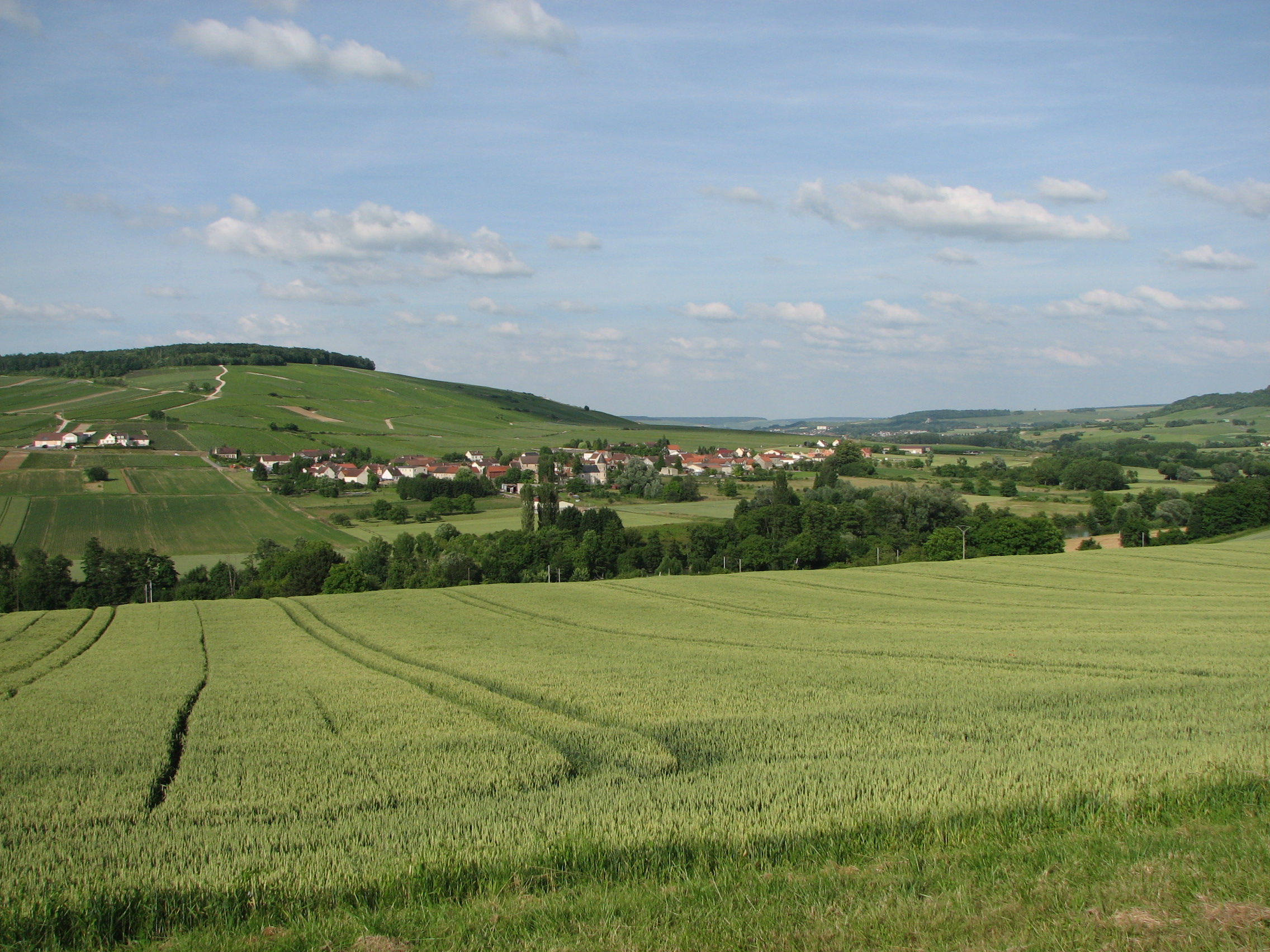
- A general view of Passy-sur-Marne
- Location of Passy-sur-Marne
- Location within France Location within Hauts-de-France
- Coordinates: 49°03′45″N 3°34′18″E
- Country: France
- Region: Hauts-de-France
- Department: Aisne
- Arrondissement: Château-Thierry
- Canton: Essômes-sur-Marne
- Intercommunality: CA Région de Château-Thierry

Government
  - Mayor (2026–32): Alain Navarre
- Area^{1}: 3.71 km^{2} (1.43 sq mi)
- Elevation: 82 m (269 ft)
- Highest elevation: 229 m (751 ft)
- Lowest elevation: 62 m (203 ft)
- Population (2023): 139
  - Density: 37.5/km^{2} (97.0/sq mi)
- Time zone: UTC+01:00 (CET)
  - Summer (DST): UTC+02:00 (CEST)
- INSEE/Postal code: 02595 /02850
- ^{1} French Land Register data, which excludes lakes, ponds, glaciers > 1 km^{2} (0.386 sq mi or 247 acres) and river estuaries.

Passy-sur-Marne (French pronunciation: [pasi syʁ maʁn], literally Passy on Marne) is a commune in the Aisne department in Hauts-de-France in northern France.

== Population ==
Historical population
Year	Pop.	±% p.a.
1968	135	—
1975	143	+0.83%
1982	131	−1.24%
1990	121	−0.99%
1999	112	−0.86%
2007	154	+4.06%
2012	154	+0.00%
2017	126	−3.93%
2023	139	+1.65%
Source: INSEE

== See also ==
- Communes of the Aisne department
