= Nogentel =

- Commune
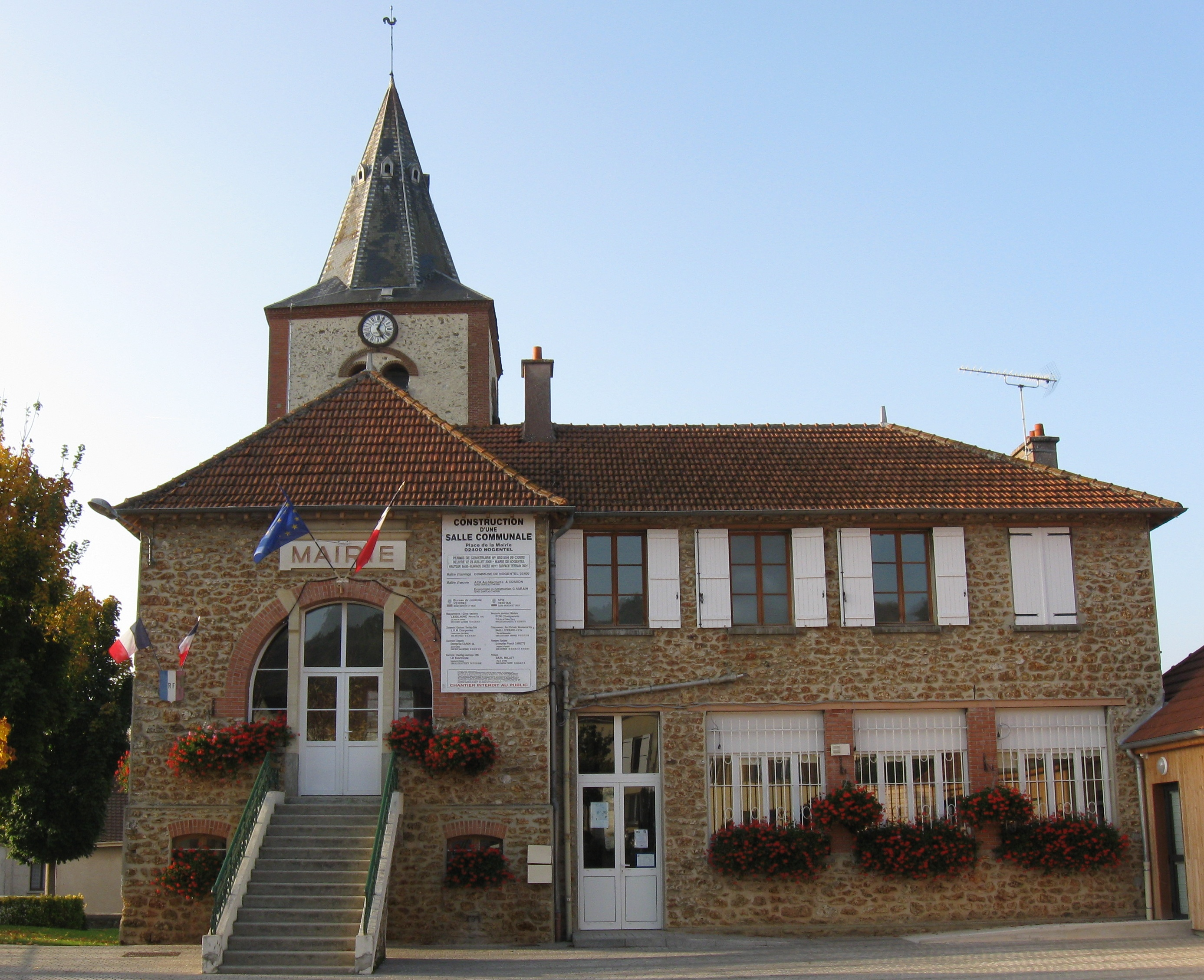
- The town hall of Nogentel

- Coat of arms
- Location of Nogentel
- Location within France Location within Hauts-de-France
- Coordinates: 49°01′02″N 3°24′12″E
- Country: France
- Region: Hauts-de-France
- Department: Aisne
- Arrondissement: Château-Thierry
- Canton: Essômes-sur-Marne
- Intercommunality: CA Région de Château-Thierry

Government
  - Mayor (2026–32): Régis Burel
- Area^{1}: 6.93 km^{2} (2.68 sq mi)
- Elevation: 70 m (230 ft)
- Highest elevation: 226 m (741 ft)
- Lowest elevation: 59 m (194 ft)
- Population (2023): 1,106
  - Density: 160/km^{2} (413/sq mi)
- Time zone: UTC+01:00 (CET)
  - Summer (DST): UTC+02:00 (CEST)
- INSEE/Postal code: 02554 /02400
- ^{1} French Land Register data, which excludes lakes, ponds, glaciers > 1 km^{2} (0.386 sq mi or 247 acres) and river estuaries.

Nogentel (French pronunciation: [nɔʒɑ̃tɛl]) is a commune in the Aisne department in Hauts-de-France in northern France.

== Population ==
Historical population
Year	Pop.	±% p.a.
1968	617	—
1975	831	+4.35%
1982	1,012	+2.86%
1990	1,128	+1.37%
1999	1,032	−0.98%
2007	1,070	+0.45%
2012	1,013	−1.09%
2017	1,012	−0.02%
2023	1,106	+1.49%
Source: INSEE

== See also ==
- Communes of the Aisne department
