= Courboin =

- Commune
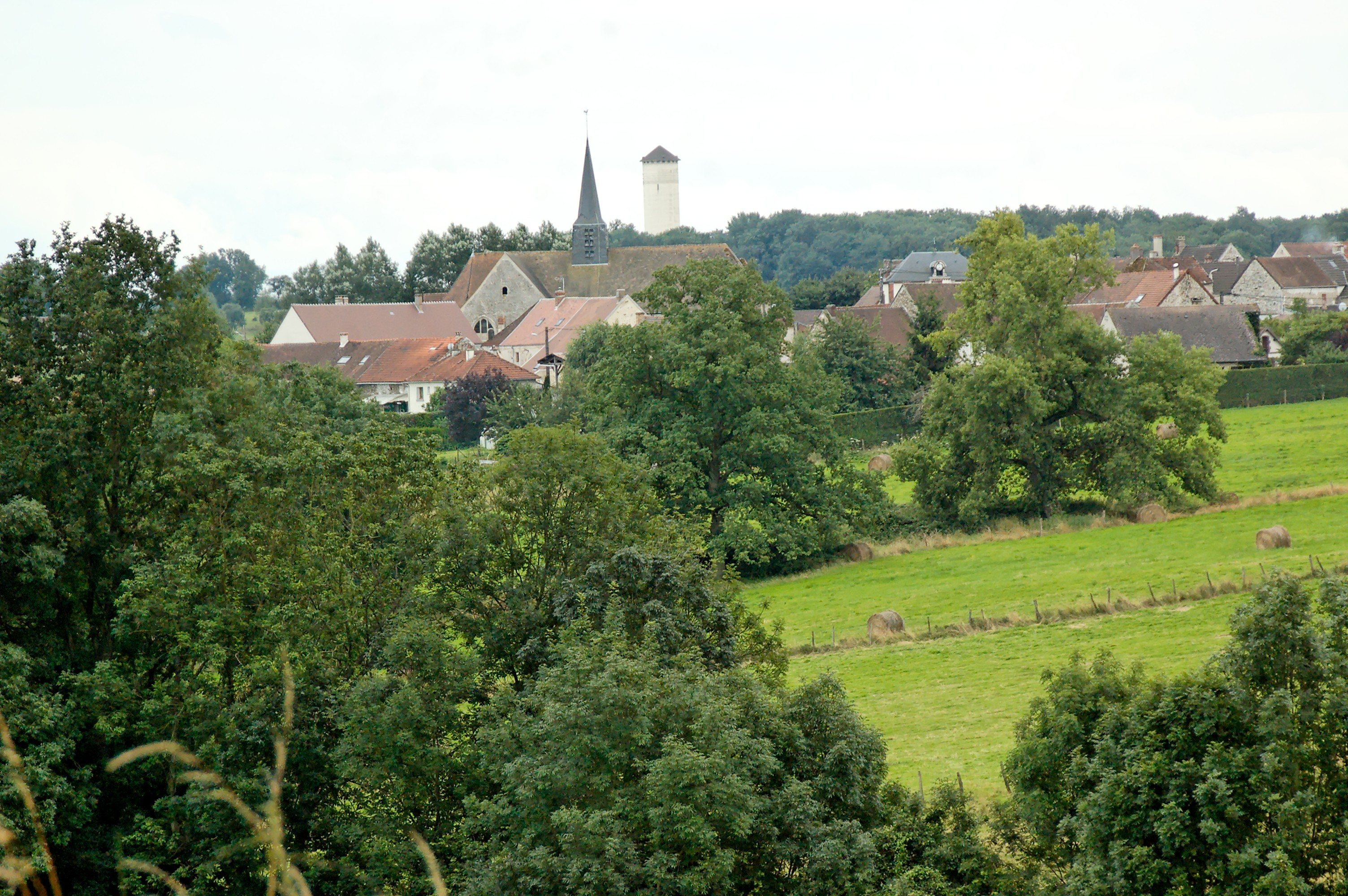
- A general view of Courboin
- Location of Courboin
- Location within France Location within Hauts-de-France
- Coordinates: 48°59′41″N 3°30′19″E
- Country: France
- Region: Hauts-de-France
- Department: Aisne
- Arrondissement: Château-Thierry
- Canton: Essômes-sur-Marne
- Intercommunality: CA Région de Château-Thierry

Government
  - Mayor (2026–32): Brigitte Rahir
- Area^{1}: 14.07 km^{2} (5.43 sq mi)
- Elevation: 202 m (663 ft)
- Highest elevation: 229 m (751 ft)
- Lowest elevation: 80 m (260 ft)
- Population (2023): 304
  - Density: 21.6/km^{2} (56.0/sq mi)
- Time zone: UTC+01:00 (CET)
  - Summer (DST): UTC+02:00 (CEST)
- INSEE/Postal code: 02223 /02330
- ^{1} French Land Register data, which excludes lakes, ponds, glaciers > 1 km^{2} (0.386 sq mi or 247 acres) and river estuaries.

Courboin (French pronunciation: [kuʁbwɛ̃]) is a commune in the Aisne department in Hauts-de-France in northern France.

== Population ==
Historical population
Year	Pop.	±% p.a.
1968	209	—
1975	205	−0.28%
1982	179	−1.92%
1990	239	+3.68%
1999	269	+1.32%
2007	280	+0.50%
2012	301	+1.46%
2017	300	−0.07%
2023	304	+0.22%
Source: INSEE

== See also ==
- Communes of the Aisne department
