= Crézancy =

- Commune
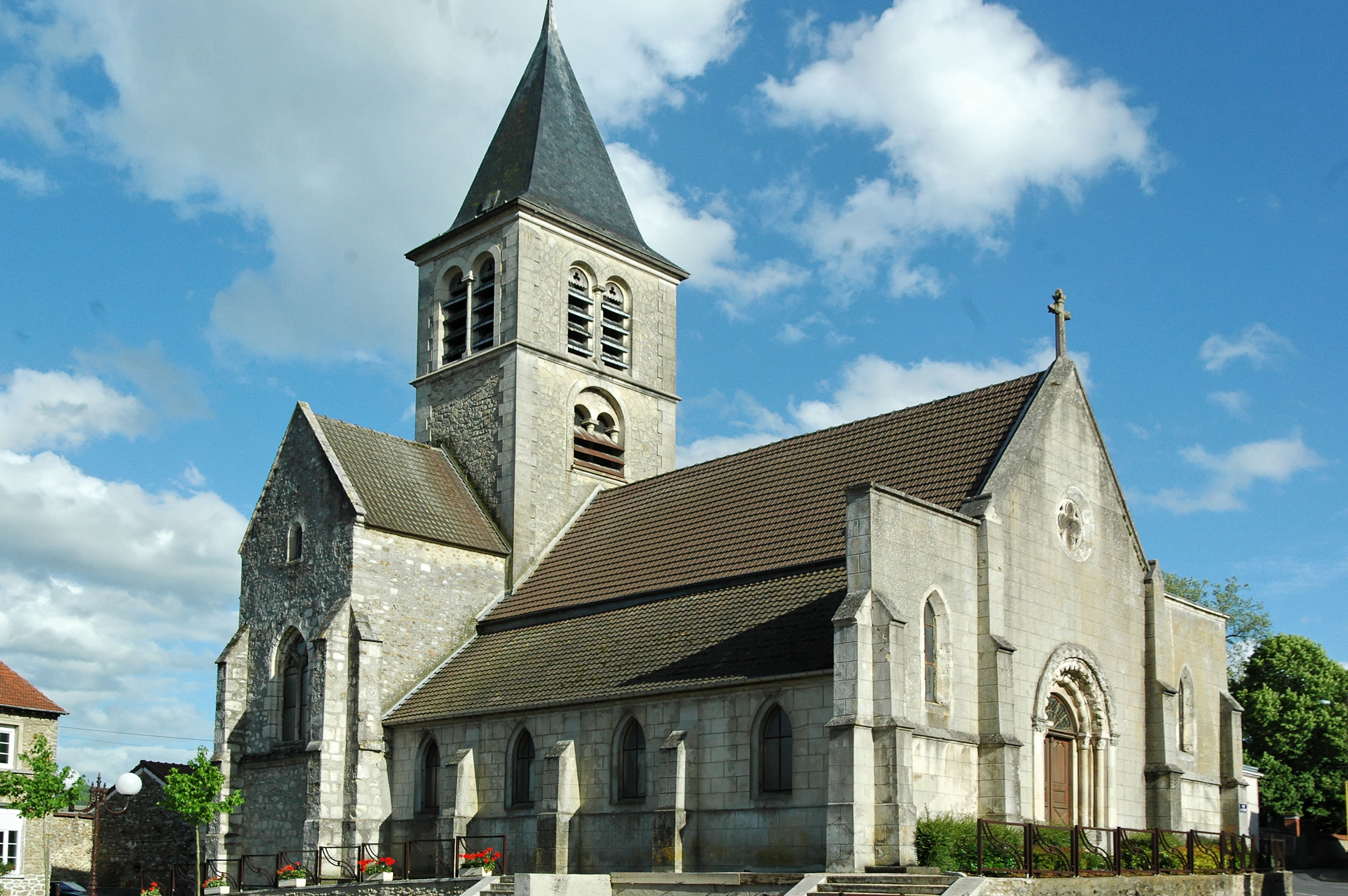
- The church of Crézancy
- Location of Crézancy
- Location within France Location within Hauts-de-France
- Coordinates: 49°02′56″N 3°30′42″E
- Country: France
- Region: Hauts-de-France
- Department: Aisne
- Arrondissement: Château-Thierry
- Canton: Essômes-sur-Marne
- Intercommunality: CA Région de Château-Thierry

Government
  - Mayor (2026–32): Eric Mangin
- Area^{1}: 7.06 km^{2} (2.73 sq mi)
- Elevation: 67 m (220 ft)
- Highest elevation: 233 m (764 ft)
- Lowest elevation: 62 m (203 ft)
- Population (2023): 1,166
  - Density: 165/km^{2} (428/sq mi)
- Time zone: UTC+01:00 (CET)
  - Summer (DST): UTC+02:00 (CEST)
- INSEE/Postal code: 02239 /02650
- ^{1} French Land Register data, which excludes lakes, ponds, glaciers > 1 km^{2} (0.386 sq mi or 247 acres) and river estuaries.

Crézancy (French pronunciation: [kʁezɑ̃si]) is a commune in the Aisne department in Hauts-de-France in northern France.

Crézancy is located on ex-national road 3, which links Paris to Strasbourg. It is home of a Lycée specialized in Viticulture.

== Population ==
Historical population
Year	Pop.	±% p.a.
1968	837	—
1975	970	+2.13%
1982	1,005	+0.51%
1990	1,033	+0.34%
1999	1,069	+0.38%
2007	1,095	+0.30%
2012	1,139	+0.79%
2017	1,230	+1.55%
2023	1,166	−0.89%
Source: INSEE

== Sights ==
The church was built in the 13th century and features a Roman portal.

== See also ==
- Communes of the Aisne department
