= Saint-Eugène, Aisne =

Saint-Eugène
- Commune
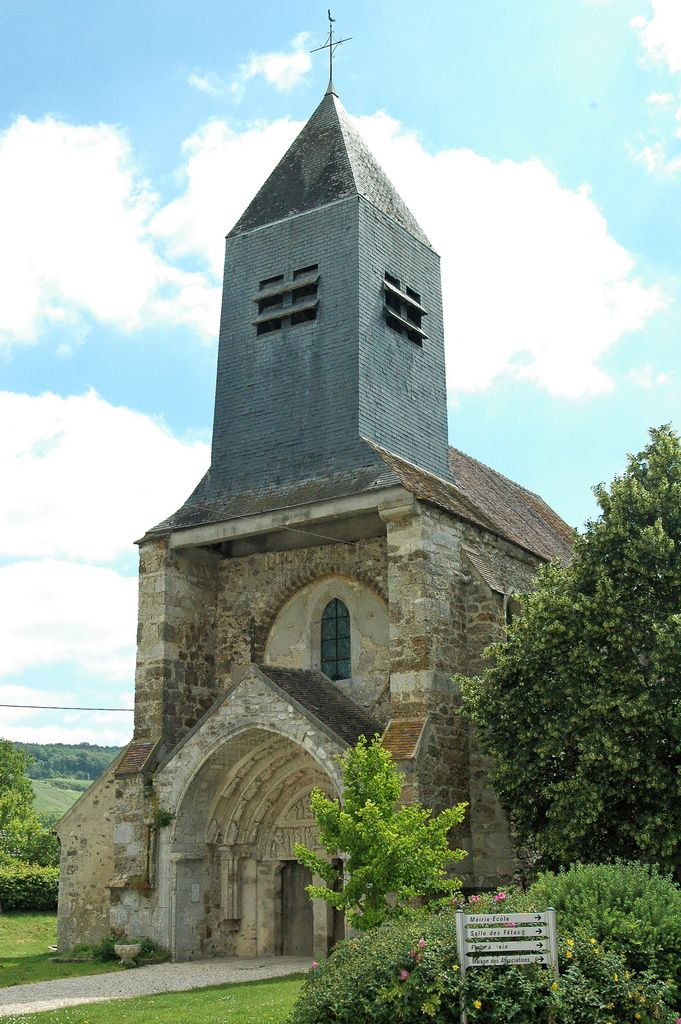
- The church of Saint-Eugène
- Location of Saint-Eugène
- Location within France Location within Hauts-de-France
- Coordinates: 49°01′20″N 3°31′54″E
- Country: France
- Region: Hauts-de-France
- Department: Aisne
- Arrondissement: Château-Thierry
- Canton: Essômes-sur-Marne
- Intercommunality: CA Région de Château-Thierry

Government
  - Mayor (2026–32): Michaël Peugniez
- Area^{1}: 6.75 km^{2} (2.61 sq mi)
- Elevation: 75 m (246 ft)
- Highest elevation: 231 m (758 ft)
- Lowest elevation: 70 m (230 ft)
- Population (2023): 232
  - Density: 34.4/km^{2} (89.0/sq mi)
- Time zone: UTC+01:00 (CET)
  - Summer (DST): UTC+02:00 (CEST)
- INSEE/Postal code: 02677 /02330
- ^{1} French Land Register data, which excludes lakes, ponds, glaciers > 1 km^{2} (0.386 sq mi or 247 acres) and river estuaries.

Saint-Eugène (French pronunciation: [sɛ̃t‿øʒɛn]) is a commune in the Aisne department in Hauts-de-France in northern France.

== Population ==
Historical population
Year	Pop.	±% p.a.
1968	176	—
1975	148	−2.44%
1982	191	+3.71%
1990	191	+0.00%
1999	203	+0.68%
2007	226	+1.35%
2012	251	+2.12%
2017	244	−0.56%
2023	232	−0.84%
Source: INSEE

== See also ==
- Communes of the Aisne department
