= Courtemont-Varennes =

- Commune
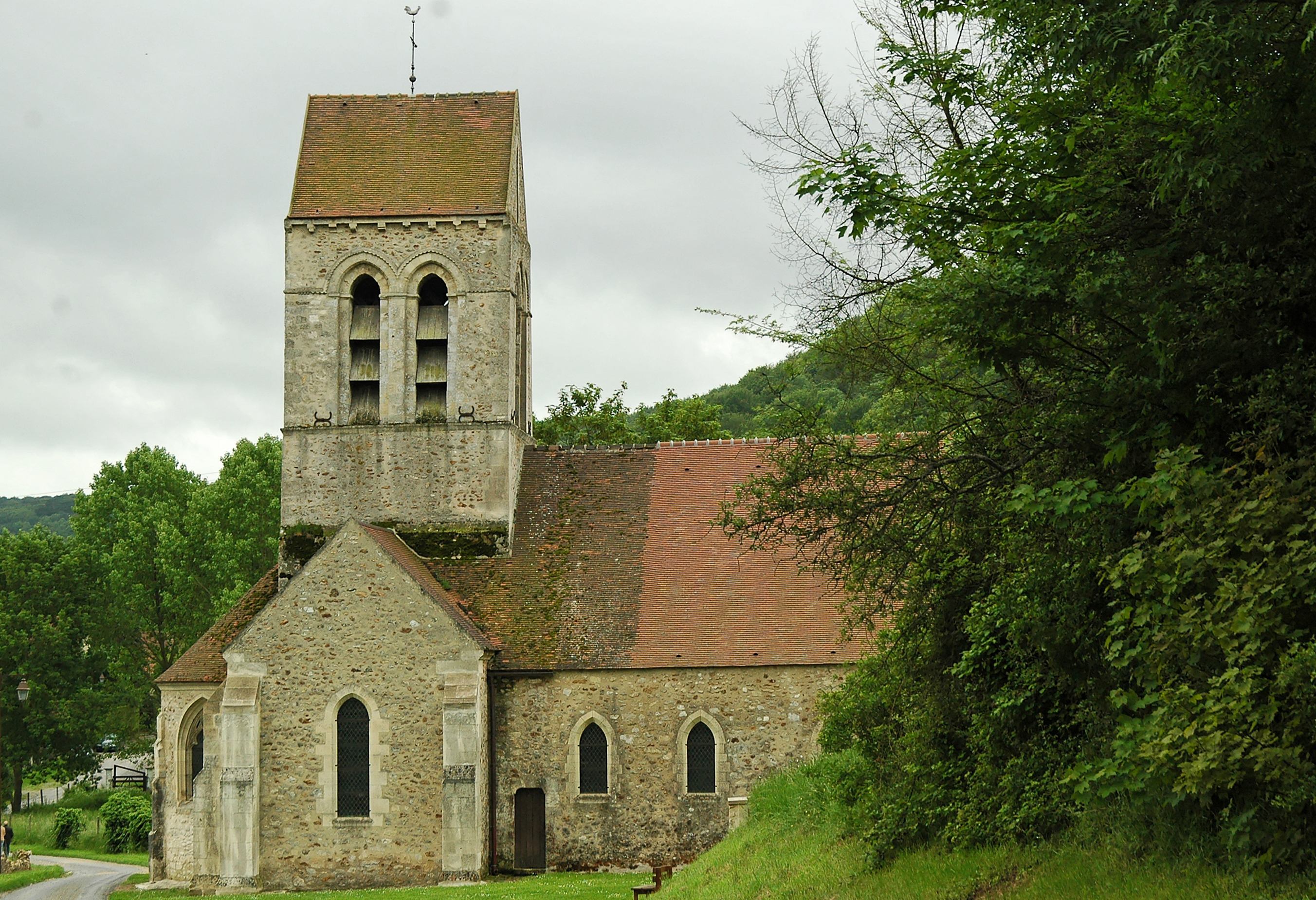
- The church of Courtemont-Varennes

- Coat of arms
- Location of Courtemont-Varennes
- Location within France Location within Hauts-de-France
- Coordinates: 49°04′29″N 3°32′33″E
- Country: France
- Region: Hauts-de-France
- Department: Aisne
- Arrondissement: Château-Thierry
- Canton: Essômes-sur-Marne
- Intercommunality: CA Région de Château-Thierry

Government
  - Mayor (2026–32): Frédéric Durthaler
- Area^{1}: 5.98 km^{2} (2.31 sq mi)
- Elevation: 67 m (220 ft)
- Highest elevation: 224 m (735 ft)
- Lowest elevation: 62 m (203 ft)
- Population (2023): 361
  - Density: 60.4/km^{2} (156/sq mi)
- Time zone: UTC+01:00 (CET)
  - Summer (DST): UTC+02:00 (CEST)
- INSEE/Postal code: 02228 /02850
- ^{1} French Land Register data, which excludes lakes, ponds, glaciers > 1 km^{2} (0.386 sq mi or 247 acres) and river estuaries.

Courtemont-Varennes (French pronunciation: [kuʁtəmɔ̃ vaʁɛn]) is a commune in the Aisne department in Hauts-de-France in northern France.

== Population ==
Historical population
Year	Pop.	±% p.a.
1968	231	—
1975	226	−0.31%
1982	250	+1.45%
1990	289	+1.83%
1999	295	+0.23%
2007	296	+0.04%
2012	286	−0.68%
2017	333	+3.09%
2023	361	+1.35%
Source: INSEE

== See also ==
- Communes of the Aisne department
