= Mézy-Moulins =

- Commune
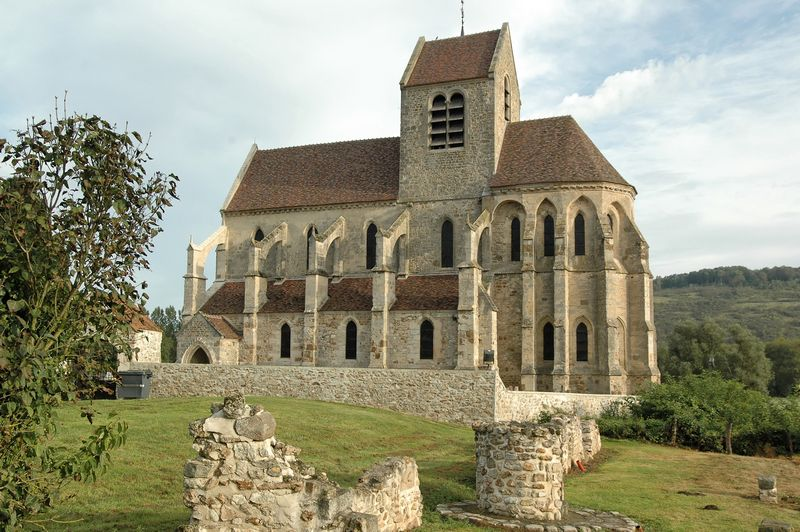
- The church of Mézy-Moulins
- Location of Mézy-Moulins
- Location within France Location within Hauts-de-France
- Coordinates: 49°03′38″N 3°31′15″E
- Country: France
- Region: Hauts-de-France
- Department: Aisne
- Arrondissement: Château-Thierry
- Canton: Essômes-sur-Marne
- Intercommunality: CA Région de Château-Thierry

Government
  - Mayor (2026–32): Claude Jacquin
- Area^{1}: 4.48 km^{2} (1.73 sq mi)
- Elevation: 87 m (285 ft)
- Highest elevation: 220 m (720 ft)
- Lowest elevation: 62 m (203 ft)
- Population (2023): 558
  - Density: 125/km^{2} (323/sq mi)
- Time zone: UTC+01:00 (CET)
  - Summer (DST): UTC+02:00 (CEST)
- INSEE/Postal code: 02484 /02650
- ^{1} French Land Register data, which excludes lakes, ponds, glaciers > 1 km^{2} (0.386 sq mi or 247 acres) and river estuaries.

Mézy-Moulins (French pronunciation: [mezi mulɛ̃]) is a commune in the Aisne department in Hauts-de-France in northern France.

== Population ==
Historical population
Year	Pop.	±% p.a.
1968	325	—
1975	327	+0.09%
1982	318	−0.40%
1990	370	+1.91%
1999	461	+2.47%
2007	504	+1.12%
2012	525	+0.82%
2017	517	−0.31%
2023	558	+1.28%
Source: INSEE

== See also ==
- Communes of the Aisne department
