= Montigny-lès-Condé =

- Commune
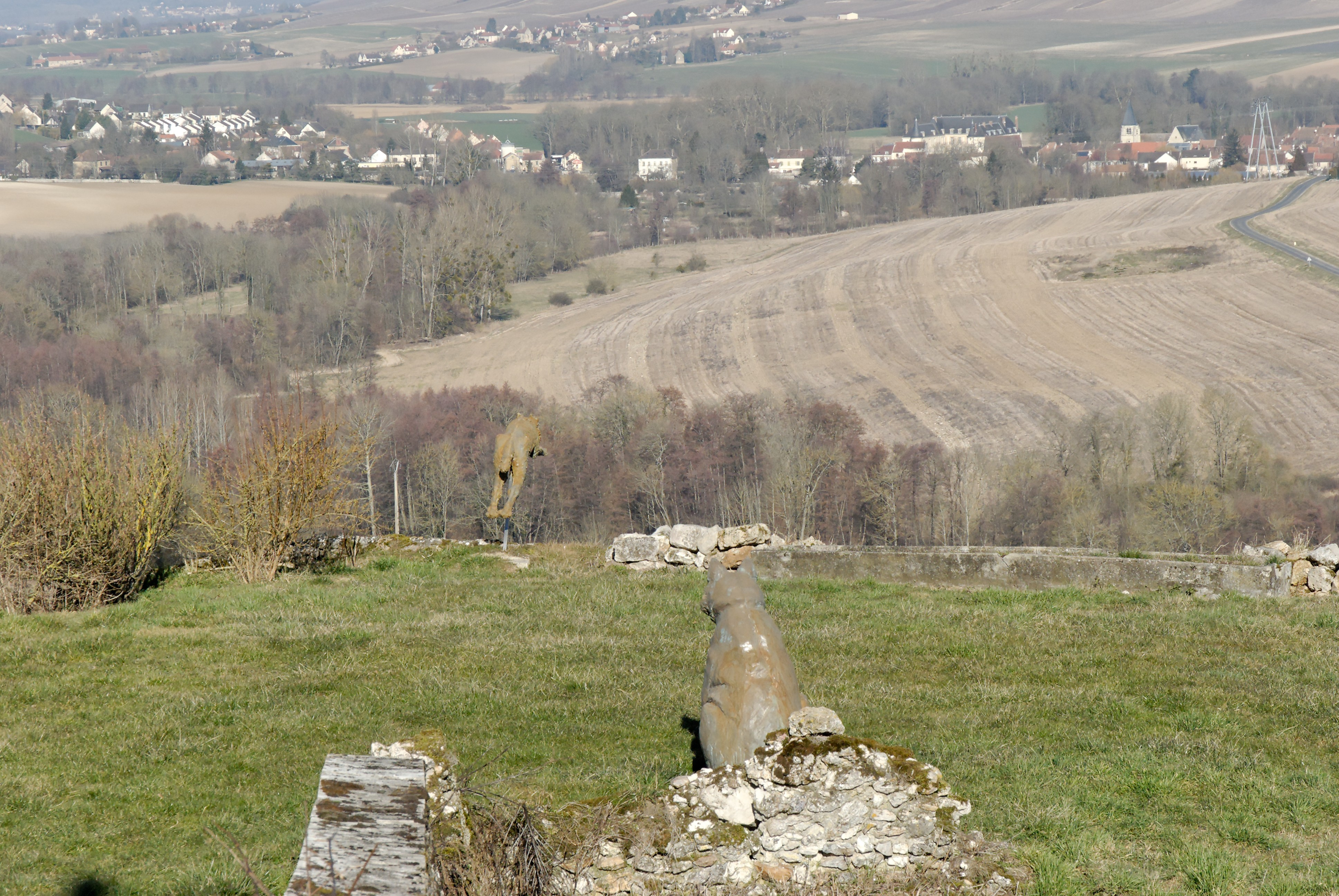
- A general view of Montigny-lès-Condé
- Location of Montigny-lès-Condé
- Location within France Location within Hauts-de-France
- Coordinates: 48°59′12″N 3°34′05″E
- Country: France
- Region: Hauts-de-France
- Department: Aisne
- Arrondissement: Château-Thierry
- Canton: Essômes-sur-Marne
- Intercommunality: CA Région de Château-Thierry

Government
  - Mayor (2026–32): Jérémy Audoux
- Area^{1}: 4.77 km^{2} (1.84 sq mi)
- Highest elevation: 223 m (732 ft)
- Lowest elevation: 81 m (266 ft)
- Population (2023): 51
  - Density: 11/km^{2} (28/sq mi)
- Time zone: UTC+01:00 (CET)
  - Summer (DST): UTC+02:00 (CEST)
- INSEE/Postal code: 02515 /02330
- ^{1} French Land Register data, which excludes lakes, ponds, glaciers > 1 km^{2} (0.386 sq mi or 247 acres) and river estuaries.

Montigny-lès-Condé (French pronunciation: [mɔ̃tiɲi lɛ kɔ̃de], literally Montigny near Condé) is a commune in the Aisne department in Hauts-de-France in northern France.

== Population ==
Historical population
Year	Pop.	±% p.a.
1968	67	—
1975	57	−2.28%
1982	53	−1.03%
1990	52	−0.24%
1999	56	+0.83%
2007	61	+1.07%
2012	75	+4.22%
2017	59	−4.69%
2023	51	−2.40%
Source: INSEE

== See also ==
- Communes of the Aisne department
