= Trélou-sur-Marne =

- Commune
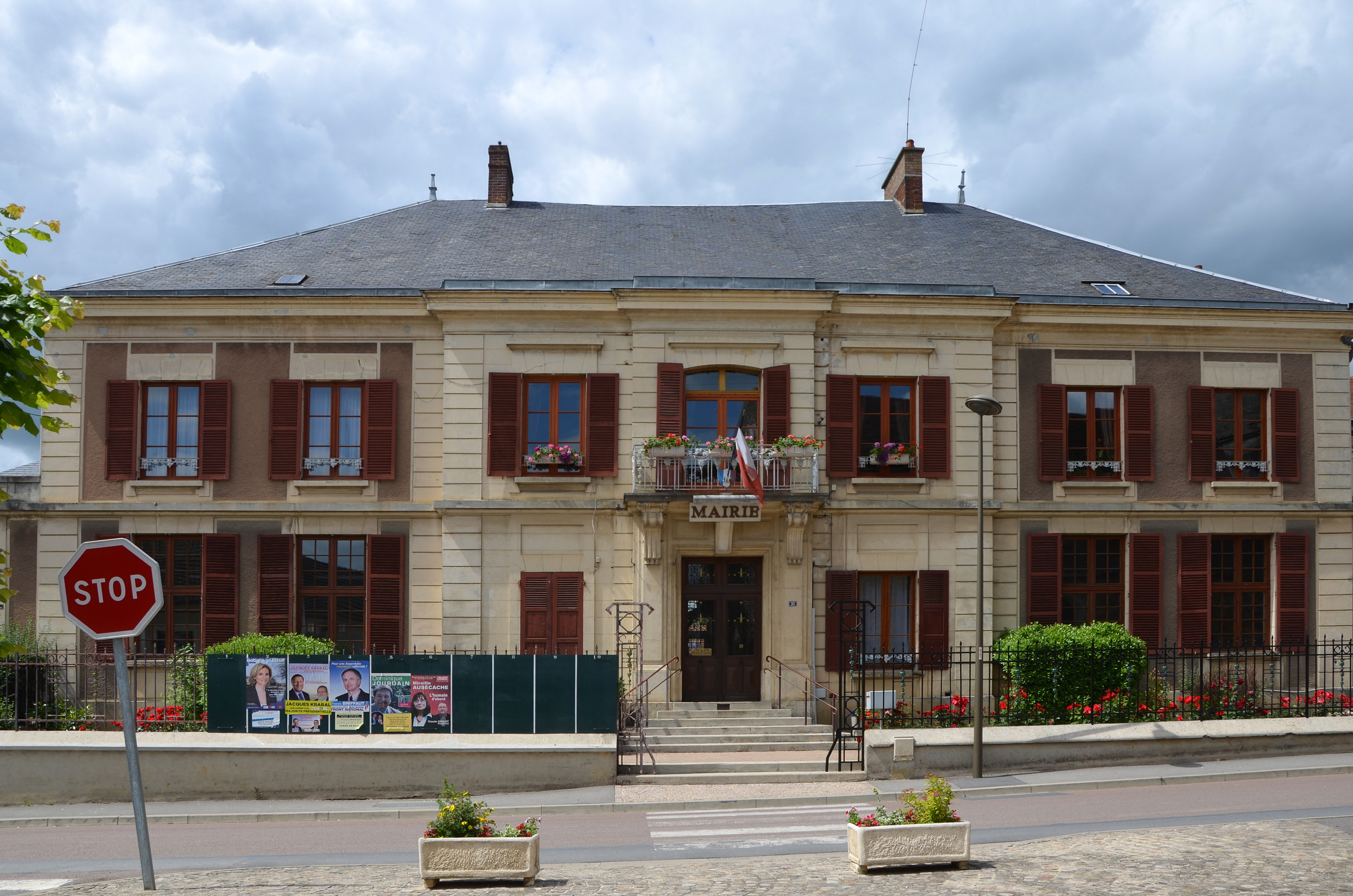
- Town hall

- Coat of arms
- Location of Trélou-sur-Marne
- Location within France Location within Hauts-de-France
- Coordinates: 49°04′39″N 3°36′28″E
- Country: France
- Region: Hauts-de-France
- Department: Aisne
- Arrondissement: Château-Thierry
- Canton: Essômes-sur-Marne
- Intercommunality: CA Région de Château-Thierry

Government
  - Mayor (2026–32): Didier Kohler
- Area^{1}: 20.35 km^{2} (7.86 sq mi)
- Elevation: 62 m (203 ft)
- Highest elevation: 234 m (768 ft)
- Lowest elevation: 62 m (203 ft)
- Population (2023): 952
  - Density: 46.8/km^{2} (121/sq mi)
- Time zone: UTC+01:00 (CET)
  - Summer (DST): UTC+02:00 (CEST)
- INSEE/Postal code: 02748 /02850
- ^{1} French Land Register data, which excludes lakes, ponds, glaciers > 1 km^{2} (0.386 sq mi or 247 acres) and river estuaries.

Trélou-sur-Marne (French pronunciation: [tʁelu syʁ maʁn], literally Trélou on Marne) is a commune in the Aisne department in Hauts-de-France in northern France.

== Population ==
Historical population
Year	Pop.	±% p.a.
1968	944	—
1975	871	−1.14%
1982	875	+0.07%
1990	854	−0.30%
1999	892	+0.48%
2007	945	+0.72%
2012	969	+0.50%
2017	948	−0.44%
2023	952	+0.07%
Source: INSEE

== See also ==
- Communes of the Aisne department
