= Montlevon =

- Commune
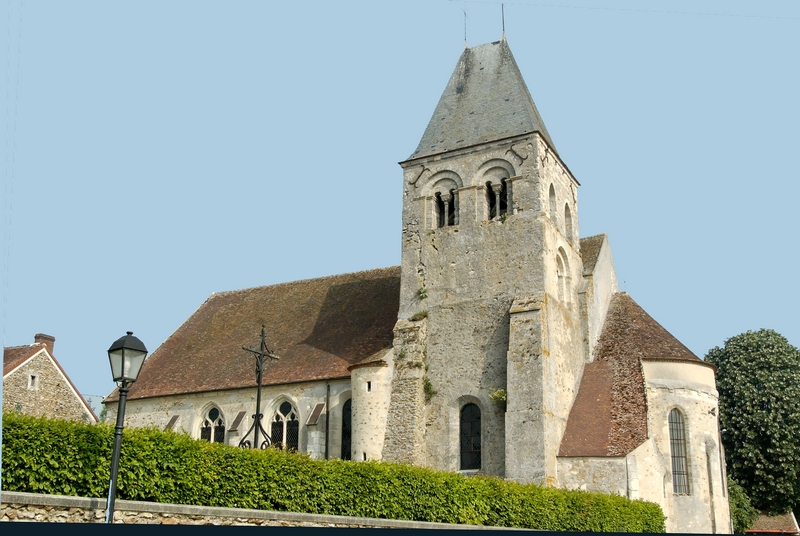
- The church of Montlevon
- Location of Montlevon
- Location within France Location within Hauts-de-France
- Coordinates: 48°58′00″N 3°32′24″E
- Country: France
- Region: Hauts-de-France
- Department: Aisne
- Arrondissement: Château-Thierry
- Canton: Essômes-sur-Marne
- Intercommunality: CA Région de Château-Thierry

Government
  - Mayor (2026–32): Nelly Guedrat
- Area^{1}: 22.65 km^{2} (8.75 sq mi)
- Elevation: 172 m (564 ft)
- Highest elevation: 224 m (735 ft)
- Lowest elevation: 87 m (285 ft)
- Population (2023): 279
  - Density: 12.3/km^{2} (31.9/sq mi)
- Time zone: UTC+01:00 (CET)
  - Summer (DST): UTC+02:00 (CEST)
- INSEE/Postal code: 02518 /02330
- ^{1} French Land Register data, which excludes lakes, ponds, glaciers > 1 km^{2} (0.386 sq mi or 247 acres) and river estuaries.

Montlevon (French pronunciation: [mɔ̃ləvɔ̃]) is a commune in the Aisne department in Hauts-de-France in northern France.

== Population ==
Historical population
Year	Pop.	±% p.a.
1968	287	—
1975	234	−2.87%
1982	227	−0.43%
1990	249	+1.16%
1999	255	+0.26%
2007	252	−0.15%
2012	271	+1.46%
2017	301	+2.12%
2023	279	−1.26%
Source: INSEE

== See also ==
- Communes of the Aisne department
