= La Chapelle-sur-Chézy =

- Commune
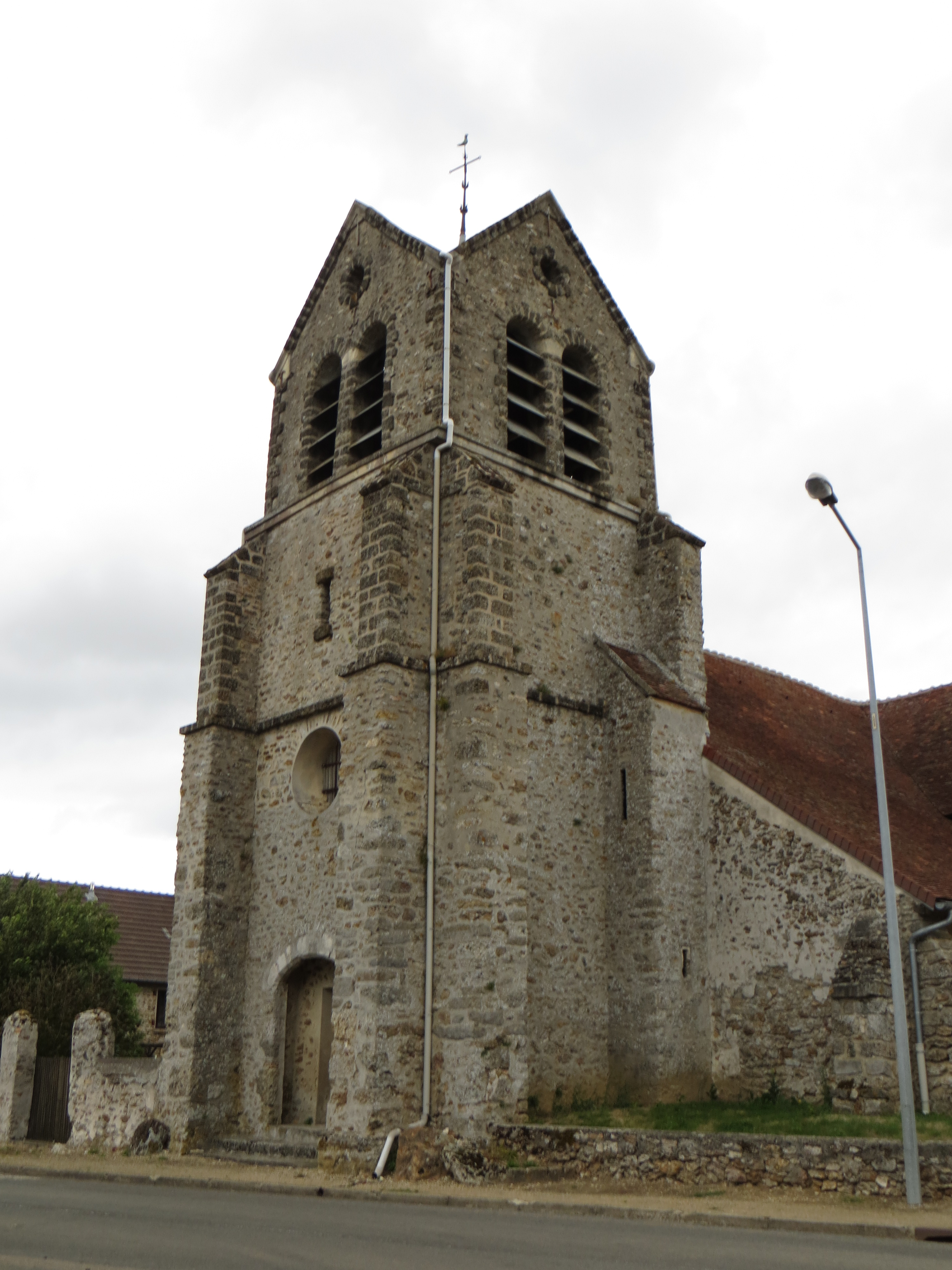
- The church of La Chapelle-sur-Chézy

- Coat of arms
- Location of La Chapelle-sur-Chézy
- Location within France Location within Hauts-de-France
- Coordinates: 48°56′47″N 3°22′41″E
- Country: France
- Region: Hauts-de-France
- Department: Aisne
- Arrondissement: Château-Thierry
- Canton: Essômes-sur-Marne
- Intercommunality: Charly sur Marne

Government
  - Mayor (2026–32): Patricia Loiseau
- Area^{1}: 7.9 km^{2} (3.1 sq mi)
- Elevation: 205 m (673 ft)
- Highest elevation: 216 m (709 ft)
- Lowest elevation: 187 m (614 ft)
- Population (2023): 301
  - Density: 38/km^{2} (99/sq mi)
- Time zone: UTC+01:00 (CET)
  - Summer (DST): UTC+02:00 (CEST)
- INSEE/Postal code: 02162 /02570
- ^{1} French Land Register data, which excludes lakes, ponds, glaciers > 1 km^{2} (0.386 sq mi or 247 acres) and river estuaries.

La Chapelle-sur-Chézy (French pronunciation: [la ʃapɛl syʁ ʃezi], literally La Chapelle on Chézy) is a commune in the Aisne department in Hauts-de-France in northern France.

== Population ==
Historical population
Year	Pop.	±% p.a.
1968	166	—
1975	164	−0.17%
1982	131	−3.16%
1990	182	+4.20%
1999	218	+2.03%
2007	263	+2.37%
2012	293	+2.18%
2017	278	−1.05%
2023	301	+1.33%
Source: INSEE

== See also ==
- Communes of the Aisne department
