= Monthurel =

- Commune
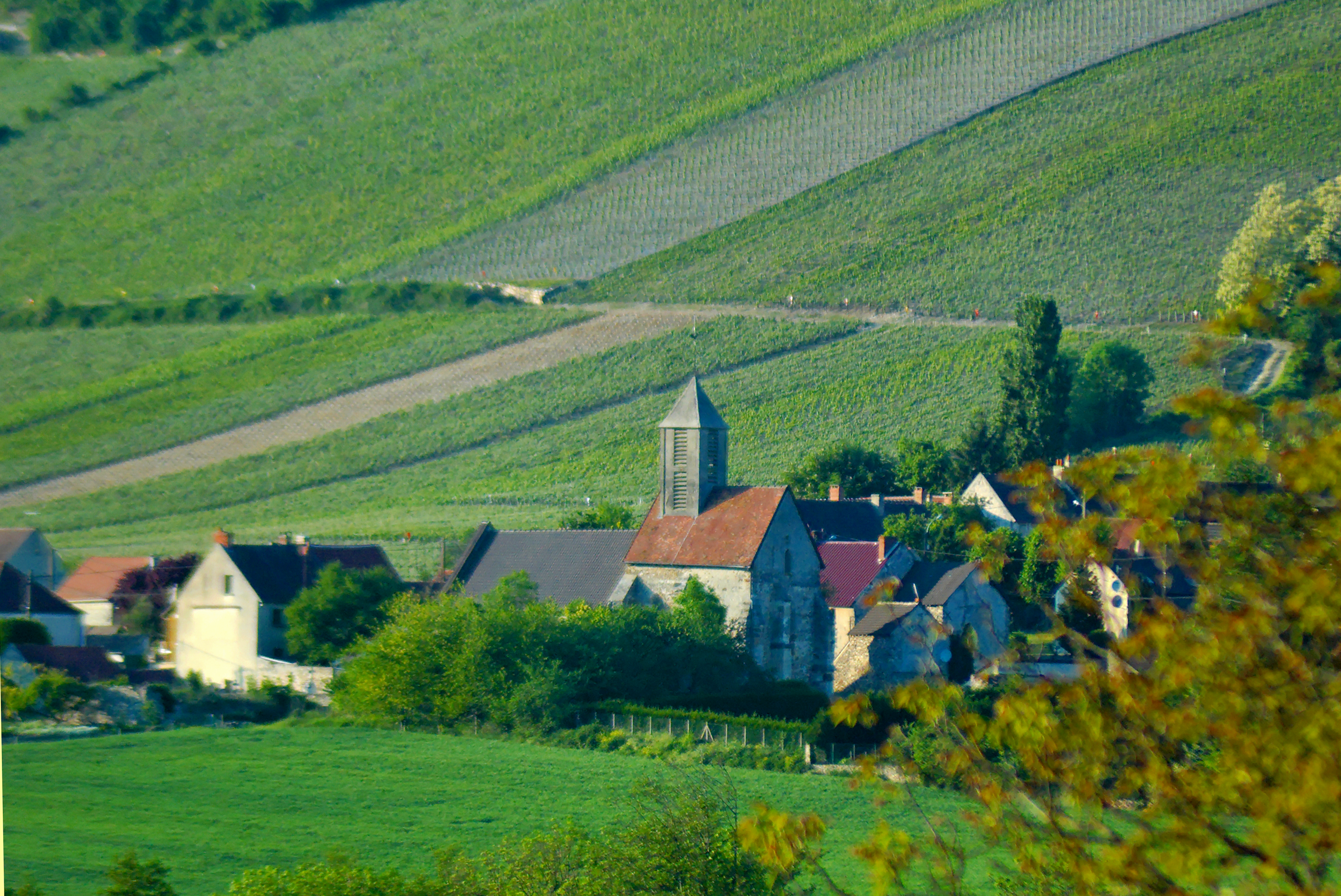
- A general view of Monthurel
- Location of Monthurel
- Location within France Location within Hauts-de-France
- Coordinates: 49°01′27″N 3°32′51″E
- Country: France
- Region: Hauts-de-France
- Department: Aisne
- Arrondissement: Château-Thierry
- Canton: Essômes-sur-Marne
- Intercommunality: CA Région de Château-Thierry

Government
  - Mayor (2026–32): Vincent Verot
- Area^{1}: 3.86 km^{2} (1.49 sq mi)
- Elevation: 103 m (338 ft)
- Highest elevation: 237 m (778 ft)
- Lowest elevation: 71 m (233 ft)
- Population (2023): 135
  - Density: 35.0/km^{2} (90.6/sq mi)
- Time zone: UTC+01:00 (CET)
  - Summer (DST): UTC+02:00 (CEST)
- INSEE/Postal code: 02510 /02330
- ^{1} French Land Register data, which excludes lakes, ponds, glaciers > 1 km^{2} (0.386 sq mi or 247 acres) and river estuaries.

Monthurel (French pronunciation: [mɔ̃tyʁɛl]) is a commune in the Aisne department in Hauts-de-France in northern France.

== Population ==
Historical population
| Year | Pop. | ±% p.a. |
|---|---|---|
| 1968 | 96 | — |
| 1975 | 94 | −0.30% |
| 1982 | 122 | +3.79% |
| 1990 | 117 | −0.52% |
| 1999 | 121 | +0.37% |
| 2007 | 158 | +3.39% |
| 2012 | 148 | −1.30% |
| 2017 | 151 | +0.40% |
| 2023 | 135 | −1.85% |
Source: INSEE

== See also ==
- Communes of the Aisne department
