= Pargny-la-Dhuys =

- Commune
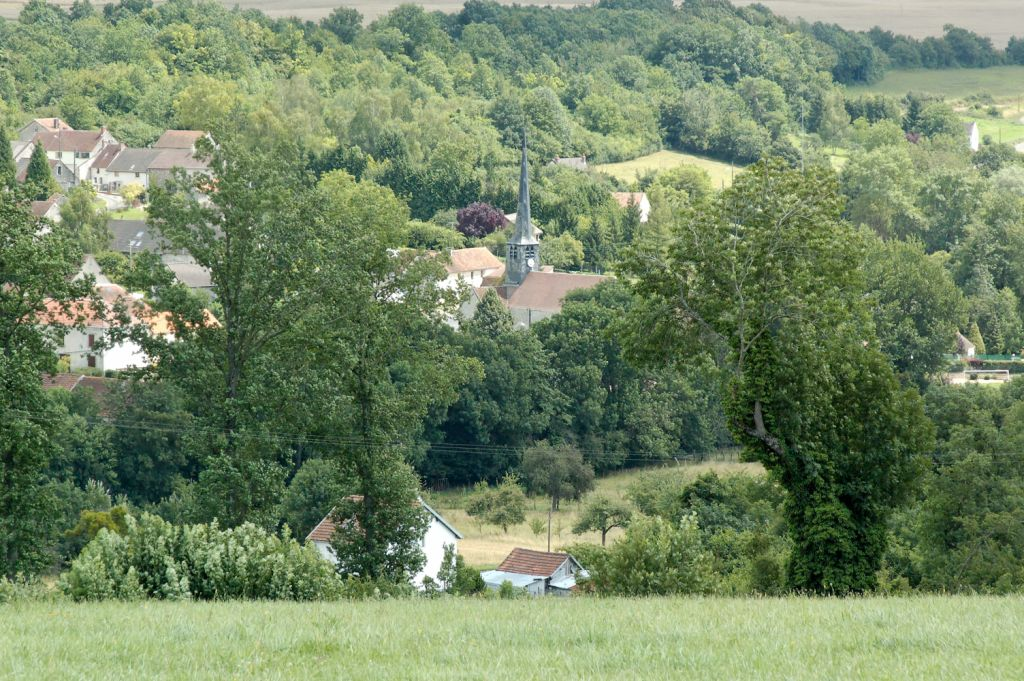
- A general view of Pargny-la-Dhuys
- Location of Pargny-la-Dhuys
- Location within France Location within Hauts-de-France
- Coordinates: 48°57′13″N 3°33′18″E
- Country: France
- Region: Hauts-de-France
- Department: Aisne
- Arrondissement: Château-Thierry
- Canton: Essômes-sur-Marne
- Intercommunality: CA Région de Château-Thierry

Government
  - Mayor (2026–32): Gaëlle Vaudé
- Area^{1}: 12.66 km^{2} (4.89 sq mi)
- Elevation: 145 m (476 ft)
- Highest elevation: 221 m (725 ft)
- Lowest elevation: 109 m (358 ft)
- Population (2023): 174
  - Density: 13.7/km^{2} (35.6/sq mi)
- Time zone: UTC+01:00 (CET)
  - Summer (DST): UTC+02:00 (CEST)
- INSEE/Postal code: 02590 /02330
- ^{1} French Land Register data, which excludes lakes, ponds, glaciers > 1 km^{2} (0.386 sq mi or 247 acres) and river estuaries.

Pargny-la-Dhuys (French pronunciation: [paʁɲi la dɥis]) is a commune in the Aisne department in Hauts-de-France in northern France.

== Population ==
Historical population
Year	Pop.	±% p.a.
1968	224	—
1975	166	−4.19%
1982	141	−2.30%
1990	156	+1.27%
1999	158	+0.14%
2007	166	+0.62%
2012	179	+1.52%
2017	170	−1.03%
2023	174	+0.39%
Source: INSEE

== Sights ==
The commune's church is St. Martin Church, which has Gothic arches and a slender belfry.

Pargny-la-Dhuys is a former forge that was built on an iron mine belonging to the County of Braine in the fifteenth century .

The last lord of the commune was the Count de la Tour du Pin.

This is the location of the catchment of the Dhuis: an aqueduct of 131 km built between 1863 and 1865 that now supplies the city of Paris and the park at Marne-la-Vallee with water.

== See also ==
- Communes of the Aisne department
