= Connigis =

- Commune
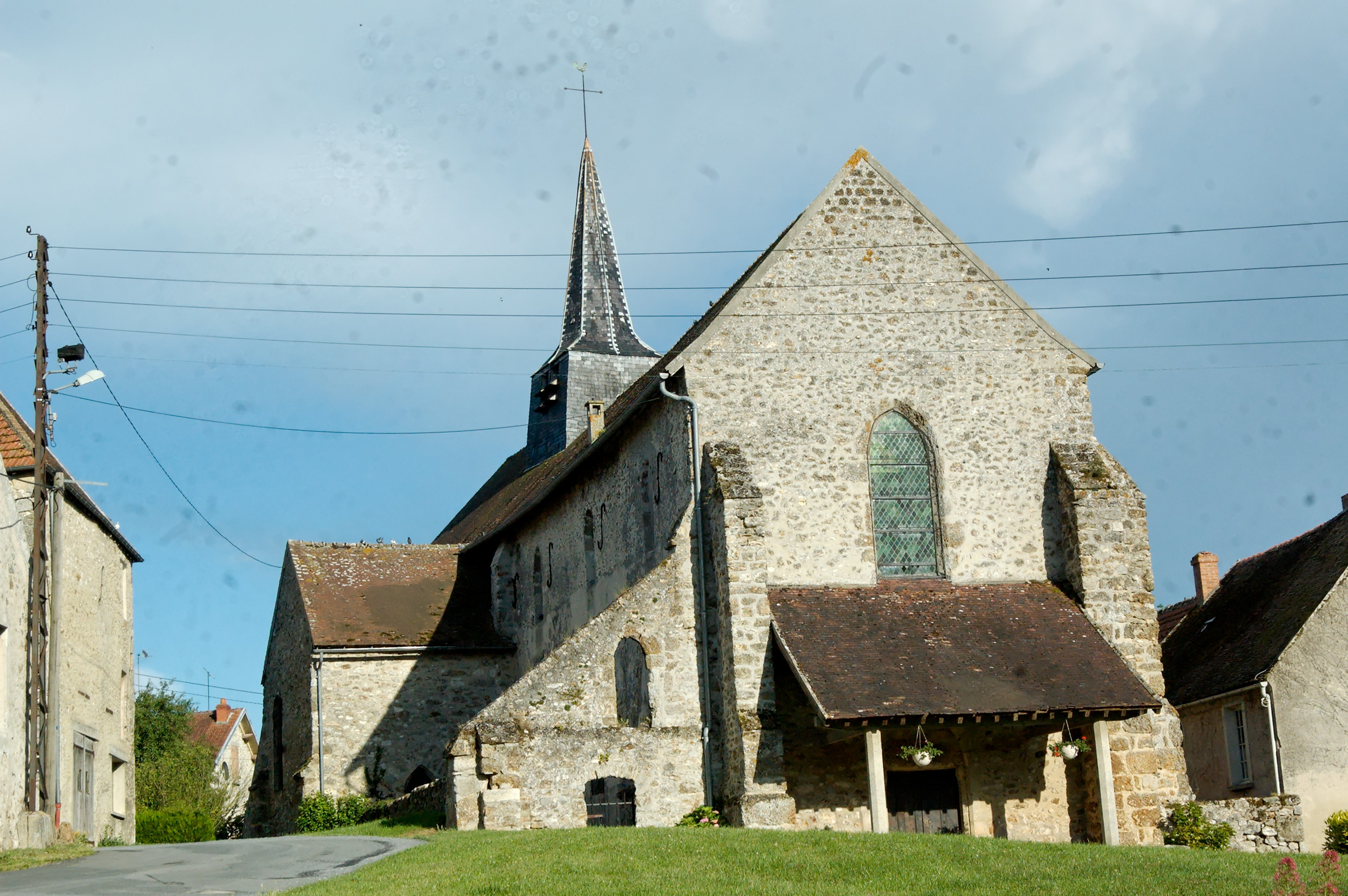
- The church of Connigis
- Location of Connigis
- Location within France Location within Hauts-de-France
- Coordinates: 49°01′56″N 3°31′54″E
- Country: France
- Region: Hauts-de-France
- Department: Aisne
- Arrondissement: Château-Thierry
- Canton: Essômes-sur-Marne
- Intercommunality: CA Région de Château-Thierry

Government
  - Mayor (2026–32): Didier Salot
- Area^{1}: 5.46 km^{2} (2.11 sq mi)
- Elevation: 72 m (236 ft)
- Highest elevation: 233 m (764 ft)
- Lowest elevation: 67 m (220 ft)
- Population (2023): 306
  - Density: 56.0/km^{2} (145/sq mi)
- Time zone: UTC+01:00 (CET)
  - Summer (DST): UTC+02:00 (CEST)
- INSEE/Postal code: 02213 /02330
- ^{1} French Land Register data, which excludes lakes, ponds, glaciers > 1 km^{2} (0.386 sq mi or 247 acres) and river estuaries.

Connigis is a commune in the Aisne department in Hauts-de-France in northern France.

== Population ==
Historical population
Year	Pop.	±% p.a.
1968	228	—
1975	190	−2.57%
1982	216	+1.85%
1990	256	+2.15%
1999	266	+0.43%
2007	312	+2.01%
2012	316	+0.26%
2017	332	+0.99%
2023	306	−1.35%
Source: INSEE

== See also ==
- Communes of the Aisne department
