= Reuilly-Sauvigny =

- Commune
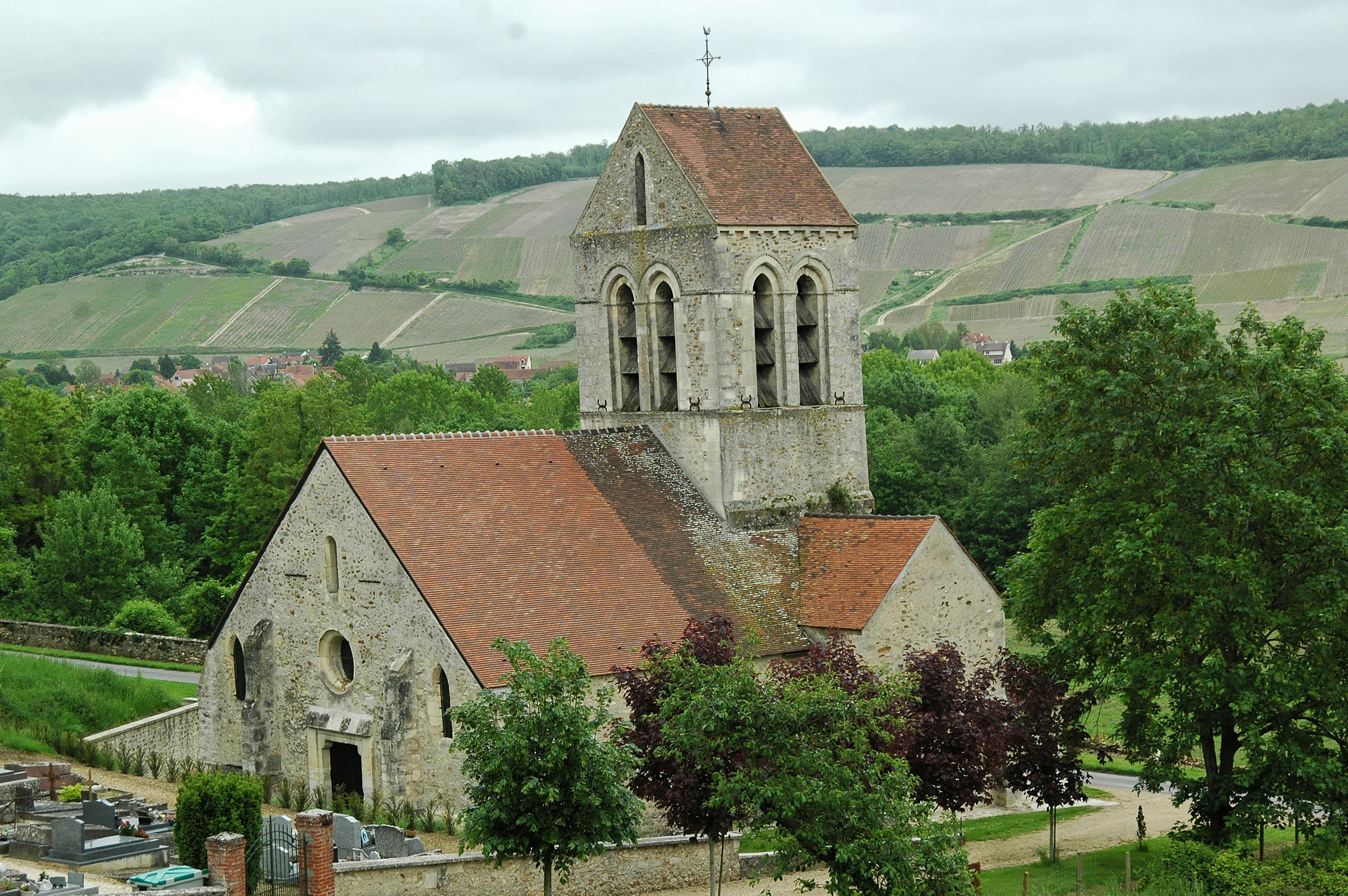
- The church of Reuilly-Sauvigny

- Coat of arms
- Location of Reuilly-Sauvigny
- Location within France Location within Hauts-de-France
- Coordinates: 49°03′32″N 3°33′30″E
- Country: France
- Region: Hauts-de-France
- Department: Aisne
- Arrondissement: Château-Thierry
- Canton: Essômes-sur-Marne
- Intercommunality: CA Région de Château-Thierry

Government
  - Mayor (2026–32): Daniel Saroul
- Area^{1}: 6.54 km^{2} (2.53 sq mi)
- Elevation: 67 m (220 ft)
- Highest elevation: 241 m (791 ft)
- Lowest elevation: 62 m (203 ft)
- Population (2023): 225
  - Density: 34.4/km^{2} (89.1/sq mi)
- Time zone: UTC+01:00 (CET)
  - Summer (DST): UTC+02:00 (CEST)
- INSEE/Postal code: 02645 /02850
- ^{1} French Land Register data, which excludes lakes, ponds, glaciers > 1 km^{2} (0.386 sq mi or 247 acres) and river estuaries.

Reuilly-Sauvigny (French pronunciation: [ʁœji soviɲi]) is a commune in the Aisne department in Hauts-de-France in northern France.

== Geography ==
The village is located in Condé-en-Brie, in the south of the Aisne department, bordering on the Marne department. About 10 kilometres to the east of the commune is Château-Thierry, which is located on a hillside in Marne.

== History ==
Two surrounding fords meant it was easiest to cross la Marne at the top of the commune, making it a strategic point during the two World wars, during which Reuilly was very heavily damaged.

== Heraldry ==
The Reuilly-Sauvigny coat of arms is emblazoned with: Green with a golden sword, three lioncubs stitched on a silver waving fabric

== Sights ==
- Église Saint Blaise, dating back to the 13th century

== Population ==
Historical population
Year	Pop.	±% p.a.
1968	155	—
1975	153	−0.19%
1982	163	+0.91%
1990	189	+1.87%
1999	213	+1.34%
2007	234	+1.18%
2012	223	−0.96%
2017	201	−2.06%
2023	225	+1.90%
Source: INSEE

== See also ==
- Communes of the Aisne department
