= Pavant =

- Commune
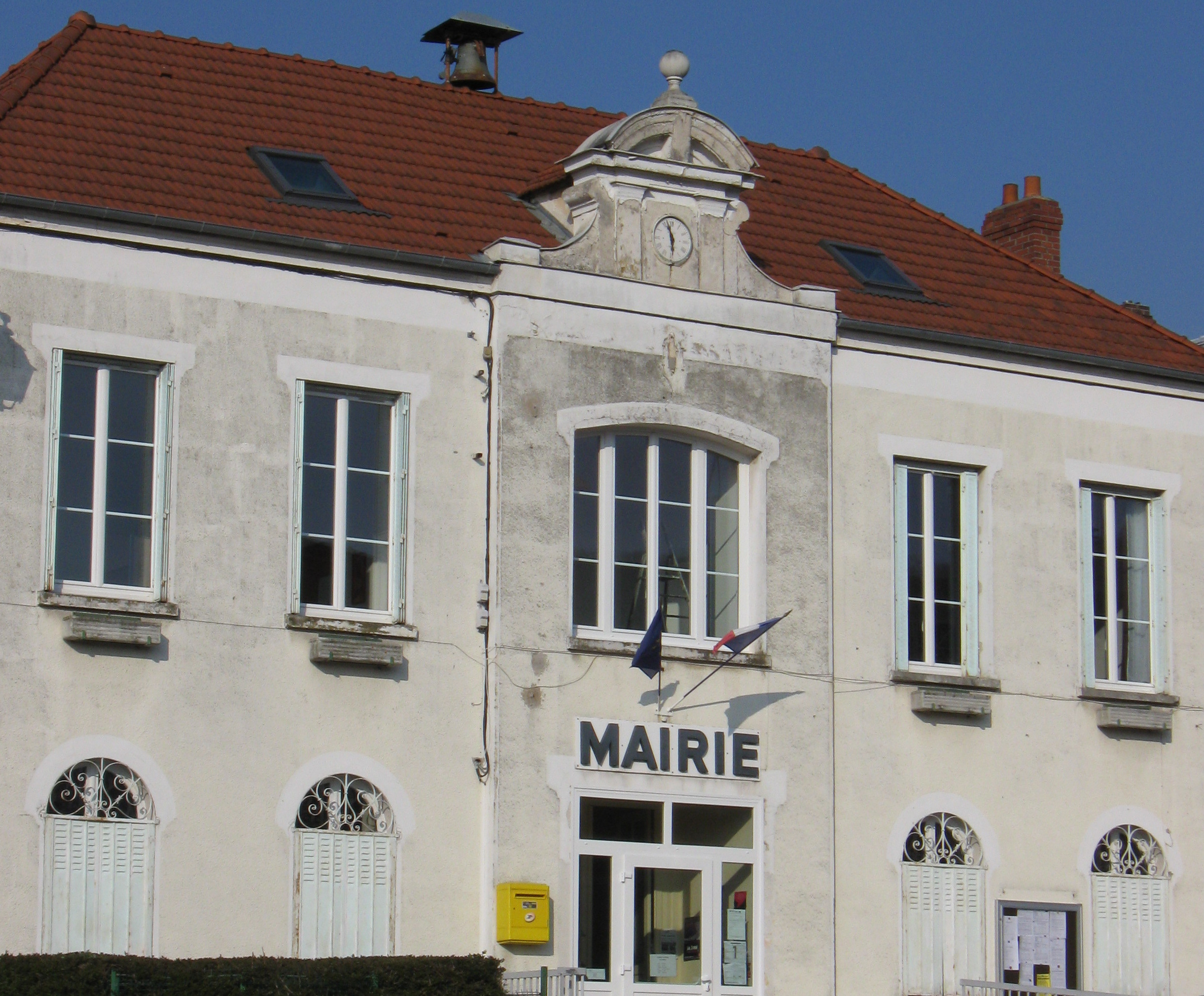
- The town hall of Pavant

- Coat of arms
- Location of Pavant
- Location within France Location within Hauts-de-France
- Coordinates: 48°57′13″N 3°17′08″E
- Country: France
- Region: Hauts-de-France
- Department: Aisne
- Arrondissement: Château-Thierry
- Canton: Essômes-sur-Marne
- Intercommunality: Charly sur Marne

Government
  - Mayor (2026–32): Pascal Angot
- Area^{1}: 5.43 km^{2} (2.10 sq mi)
- Elevation: 80 m (260 ft)
- Highest elevation: 206 m (676 ft)
- Lowest elevation: 57 m (187 ft)
- Population (2023): 745
  - Density: 137/km^{2} (355/sq mi)
- Time zone: UTC+01:00 (CET)
  - Summer (DST): UTC+02:00 (CEST)
- INSEE/Postal code: 02596 /02310
- ^{1} French Land Register data, which excludes lakes, ponds, glaciers > 1 km^{2} (0.386 sq mi or 247 acres) and river estuaries.

Pavant (French pronunciation: [pavɑ̃]) is a commune in the Aisne department in Hauts-de-France in northern France.

== Population ==
Historical population
Year	Pop.	±% p.a.
1968	511	—
1975	589	+2.05%
1982	665	+1.75%
1990	732	+1.21%
1999	753	+0.31%
2007	767	+0.23%
2012	803	+0.92%
2017	781	−0.55%
2023	745	−0.78%
Source: INSEE

== See also ==
- Communes of the Aisne department
