= Villiers-Saint-Denis =

- Commune
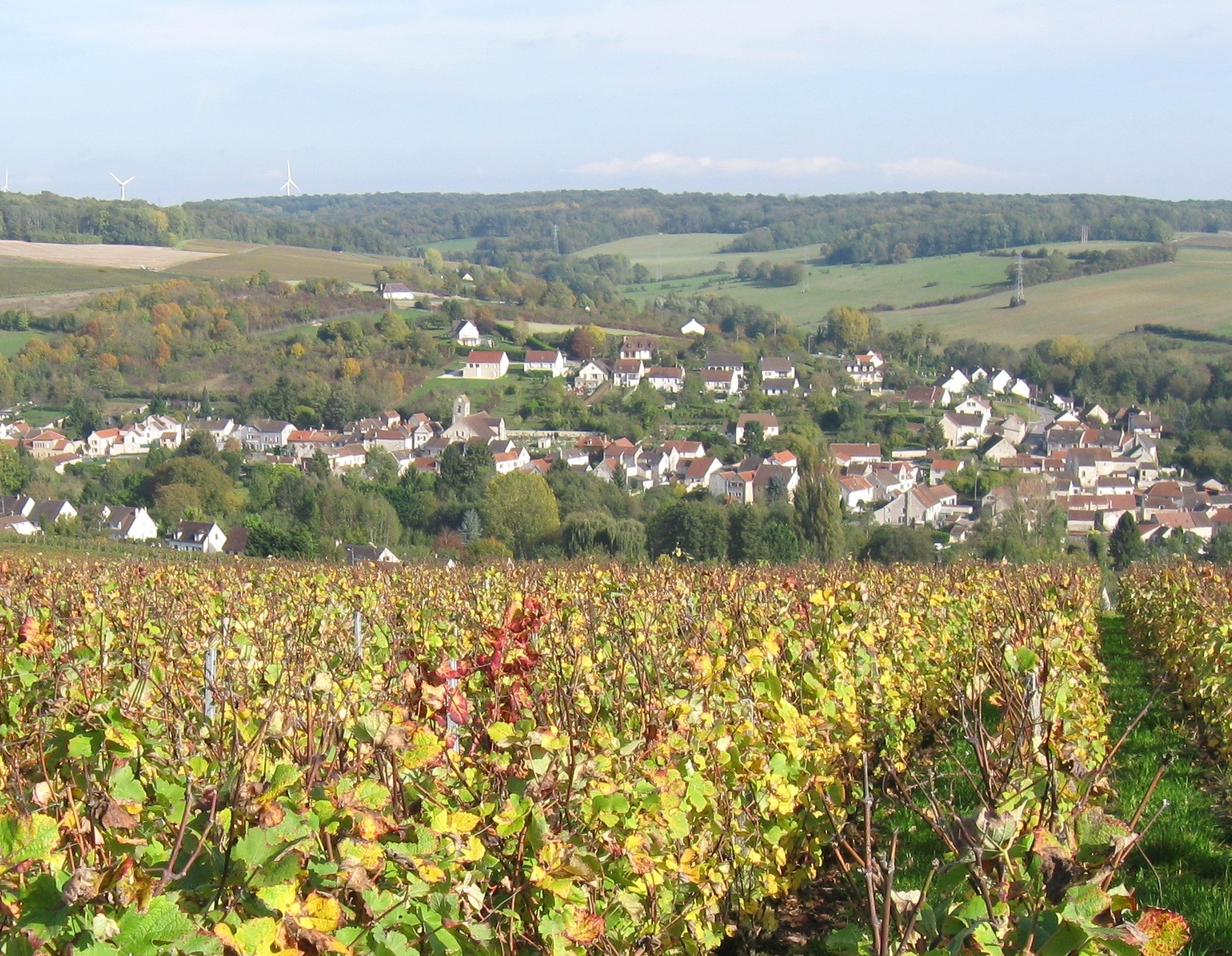
- A general view of Villiers-Saint-Denis
- Location of Villiers-Saint-Denis
- Location within France Location within Hauts-de-France
- Coordinates: 48°59′38″N 3°16′05″E
- Country: France
- Region: Hauts-de-France
- Department: Aisne
- Arrondissement: Château-Thierry
- Canton: Essômes-sur-Marne
- Intercommunality: Charly sur Marne

Government
  - Mayor (2026–32): Jean Plateaux
- Area^{1}: 7.57 km^{2} (2.92 sq mi)
- Elevation: 84 m (276 ft)
- Highest elevation: 201 m (659 ft)
- Lowest elevation: 69 m (226 ft)
- Population (2023): 997
  - Density: 132/km^{2} (341/sq mi)
- Time zone: UTC+01:00 (CET)
  - Summer (DST): UTC+02:00 (CEST)
- INSEE/Postal code: 02818 /02310
- ^{1} French Land Register data, which excludes lakes, ponds, glaciers > 1 km^{2} (0.386 sq mi or 247 acres) and river estuaries.

Villiers-Saint-Denis (French pronunciation: [vilje sɛ̃ dəni]) is a commune in the Aisne department in Hauts-de-France in northern France.

== Population ==
Historical population
Year	Pop.	±% p.a.
1968	670	—
1975	668	−0.04%
1982	768	+2.01%
1990	798	+0.48%
1999	842	+0.60%
2007	1,036	+2.63%
2012	1,041	+0.10%
2017	1,127	+1.60%
2023	997	−2.02%
Source: INSEE

== See also ==
- Communes of the Aisne department
