= Saulchery =

- Commune
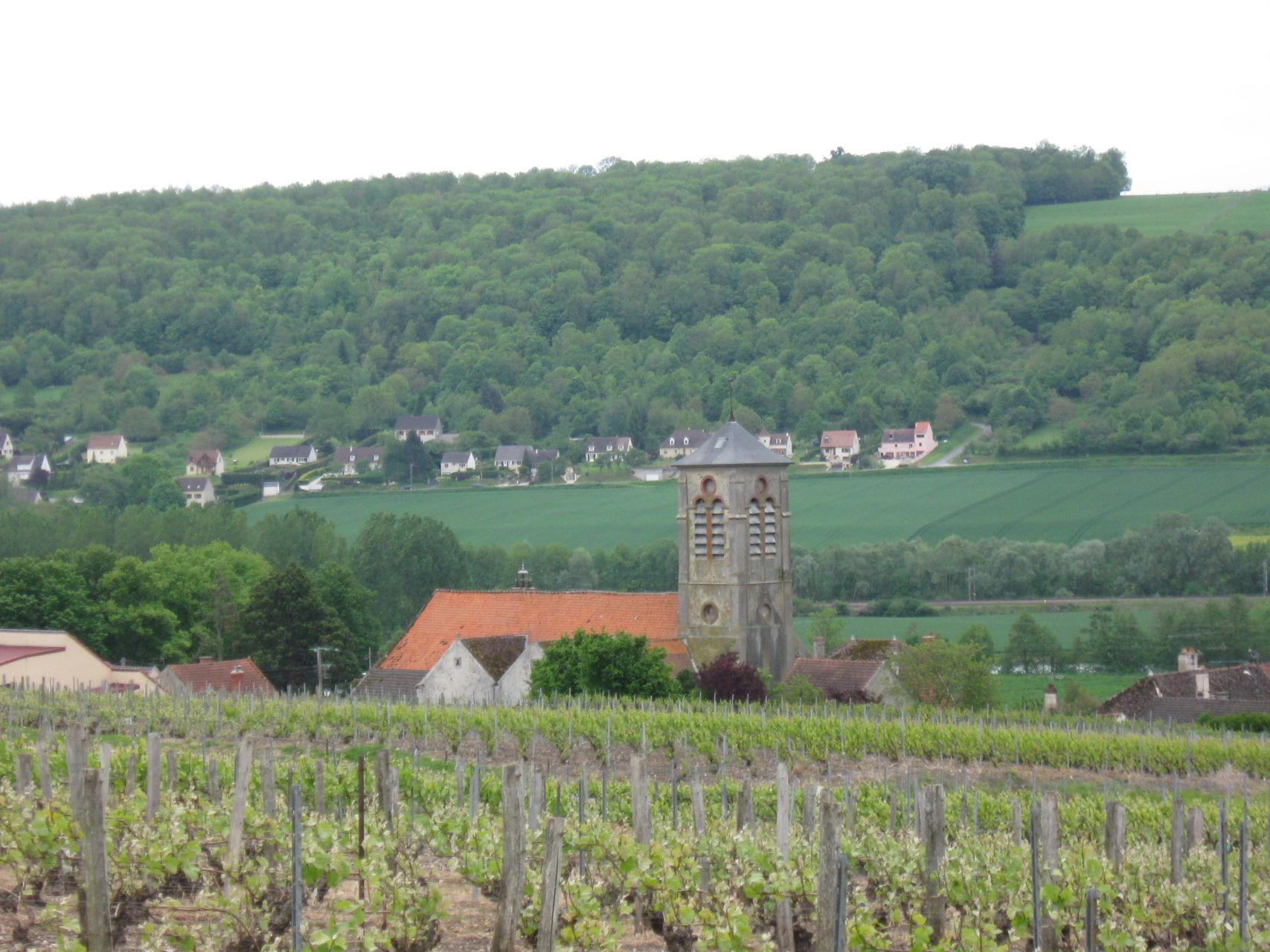
- A general view of Saulchery
- Location of Saulchery
- Location within France Location within Hauts-de-France
- Coordinates: 48°58′31″N 3°18′29″E
- Country: France
- Region: Hauts-de-France
- Department: Aisne
- Arrondissement: Château-Thierry
- Canton: Essômes-sur-Marne
- Intercommunality: Charly sur Marne

Government
  - Mayor (2026–32): Stéphane Pittana
- Area^{1}: 2.63 km^{2} (1.02 sq mi)
- Elevation: 80 m (260 ft)
- Highest elevation: 180 m (590 ft)
- Lowest elevation: 57 m (187 ft)
- Population (2023): 687
  - Density: 261/km^{2} (677/sq mi)
- Time zone: UTC+01:00 (CET)
  - Summer (DST): UTC+02:00 (CEST)
- INSEE/Postal code: 02701 /02310
- ^{1} French Land Register data, which excludes lakes, ponds, glaciers > 1 km^{2} (0.386 sq mi or 247 acres) and river estuaries.

Saulchery (French pronunciation: [solʃəʁi]) is a commune in the Aisne department in Hauts-de-France in northern France.

== Population ==
Historical population
Year	Pop.	±% p.a.
1968	575	—
1975	579	+0.10%
1982	564	−0.37%
1990	592	+0.61%
1999	661	+1.23%
2007	672	+0.21%
2012	669	−0.09%
2017	724	+1.59%
2023	687	−0.87%
Source: INSEE

== See also ==
- Communes of the Aisne department
