= Nogent-l'Artaud =

- Commune
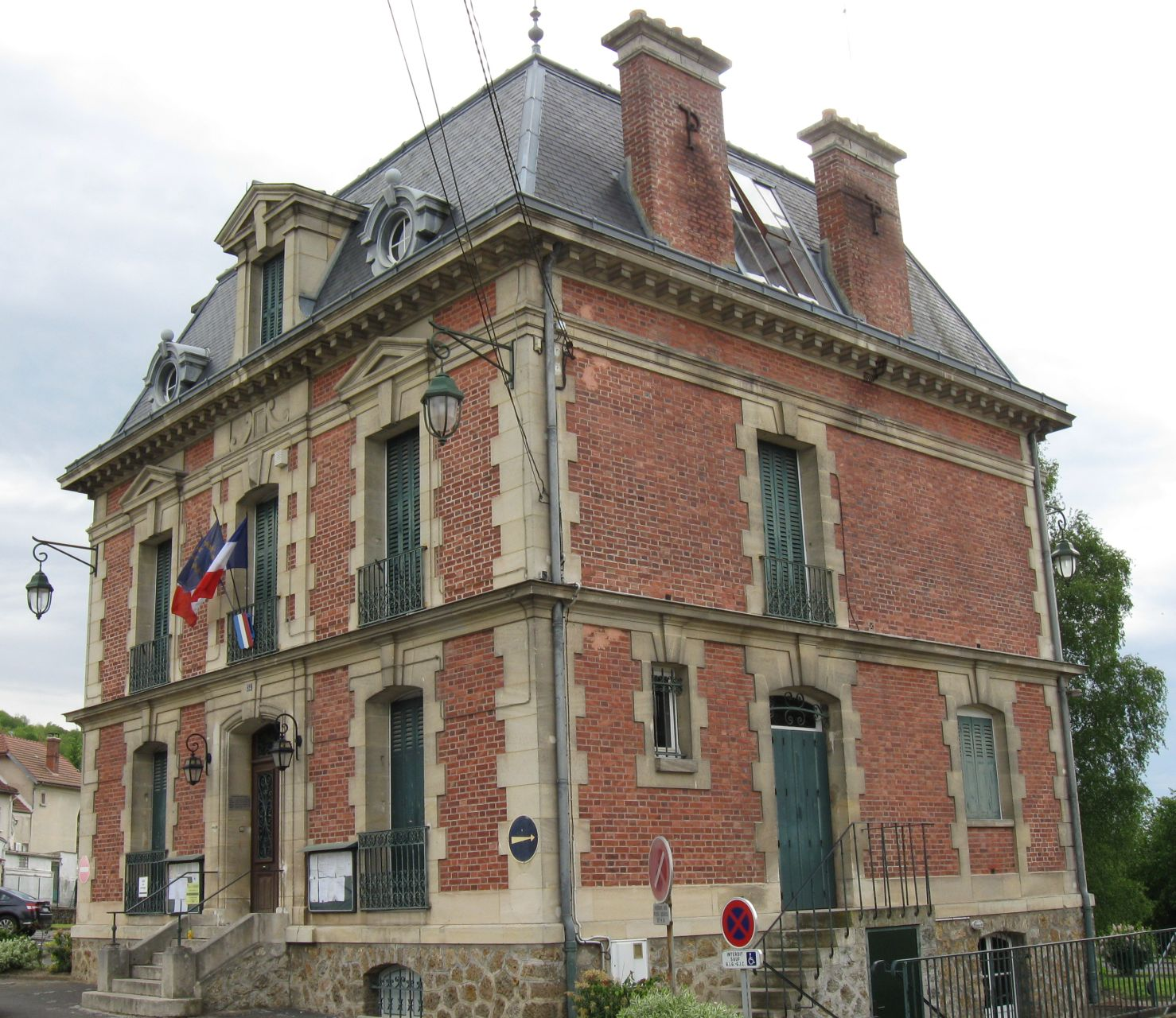
- Town hall

- Coat of arms
- Location of Nogent-l'Artaud
- Location within France Location within Hauts-de-France
- Coordinates: 48°57′56″N 3°19′28″E
- Country: France
- Region: Hauts-de-France
- Department: Aisne
- Arrondissement: Château-Thierry
- Canton: Essômes-sur-Marne
- Intercommunality: Charly sur Marne

Government
  - Mayor (2026–32): Dominique Duclos
- Area^{1}: 23.99 km^{2} (9.26 sq mi)
- Elevation: 60 m (200 ft)
- Highest elevation: 222 m (728 ft)
- Lowest elevation: 57 m (187 ft)
- Population (2023): 2,134
  - Density: 88.95/km^{2} (230.4/sq mi)
- Time zone: UTC+01:00 (CET)
  - Summer (DST): UTC+02:00 (CEST)
- INSEE/Postal code: 02555 /02310
- ^{1} French Land Register data, which excludes lakes, ponds, glaciers > 1 km^{2} (0.386 sq mi or 247 acres) and river estuaries.

Nogent-l'Artaud (French pronunciation: [nɔʒɑ̃ laʁto]) is a commune in the Aisne department and Hauts-de-France region of northern France.

== Population ==
Historical population
Year	Pop.	±% p.a.
1968	1,187	—
1975	1,270	+0.97%
1982	1,433	+1.74%
1990	1,852	+3.26%
1999	2,049	+1.13%
2007	2,130	+0.49%
2012	2,151	+0.20%
2017	2,167	+0.15%
2023	2,134	−0.26%
Source: INSEE

== See also ==
- Communes of the Aisne department
