= Viels-Maisons =

- Commune
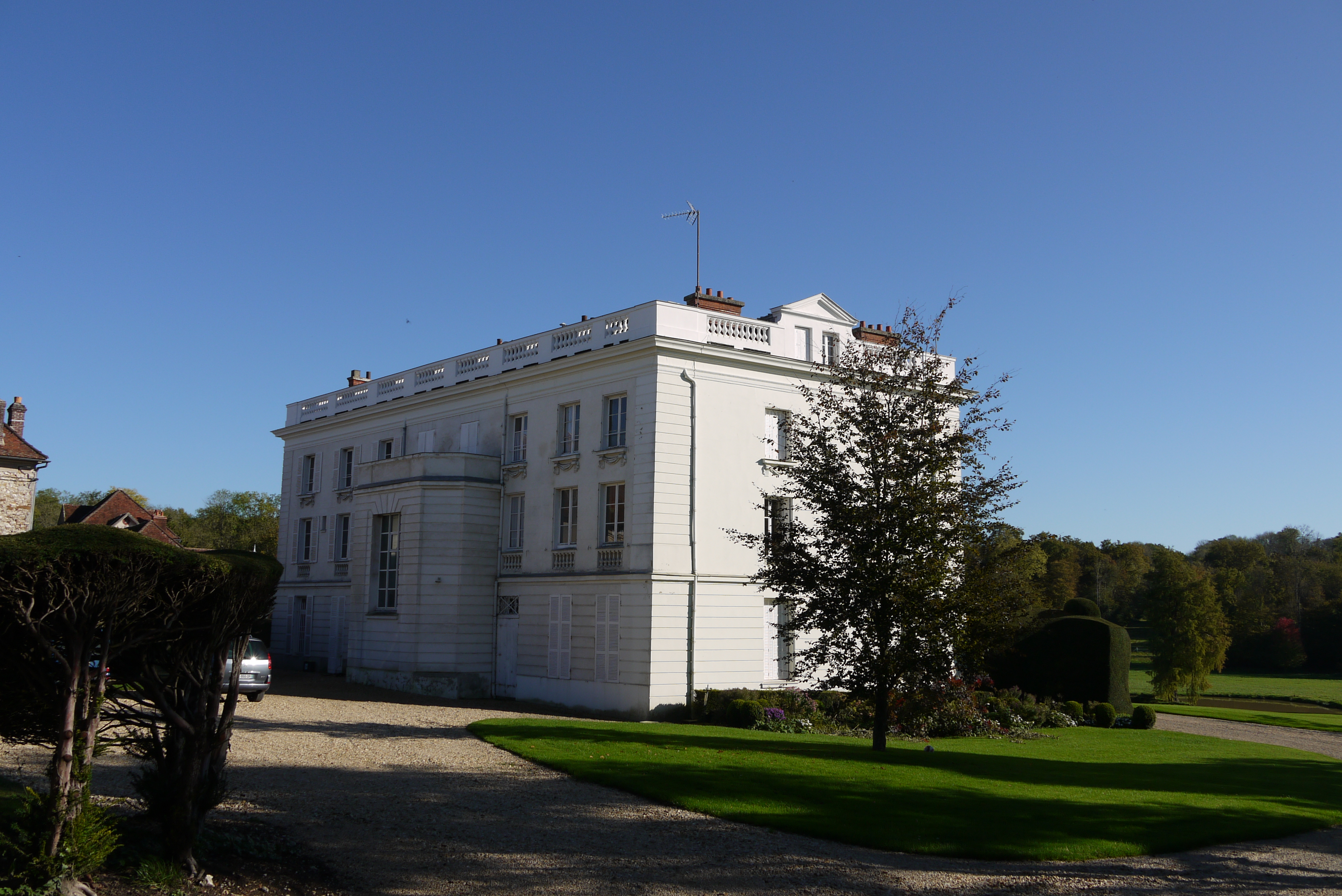
- The chateau of Viels-Maisons
- Location of Viels-Maisons
- Location within France Location within Hauts-de-France
- Coordinates: 48°53′49″N 3°23′53″E
- Country: France
- Region: Hauts-de-France
- Department: Aisne
- Arrondissement: Château-Thierry
- Canton: Essômes-sur-Marne
- Intercommunality: Charly sur Marne

Government
  - Mayor (2026–32): Alexandre Lemoine
- Area^{1}: 21.44 km^{2} (8.28 sq mi)
- Elevation: 170 m (560 ft)
- Highest elevation: 221 m (725 ft)
- Lowest elevation: 97 m (318 ft)
- Population (2023): 1,192
  - Density: 55.60/km^{2} (144.0/sq mi)
- Time zone: UTC+01:00 (CET)
  - Summer (DST): UTC+02:00 (CEST)
- INSEE/Postal code: 02798 /02540
- ^{1} French Land Register data, which excludes lakes, ponds, glaciers > 1 km^{2} (0.386 sq mi or 247 acres) and river estuaries.

Viels-Maisons (French pronunciation: [vjɛl mɛzɔ̃]) is a commune in the Aisne department in Hauts-de-France in northern France.

== Population ==
Historical population
Year	Pop.	±% p.a.
1968	680	—
1975	668	−0.25%
1982	744	+1.55%
1990	869	+1.96%
1999	962	+1.14%
2007	999	+0.47%
2012	1,065	+1.29%
2017	1,234	+2.99%
2023	1,192	−0.58%
Source: INSEE

== See also ==
- Communes of the Aisne department
