= Lucy-le-Bocage =

- Commune
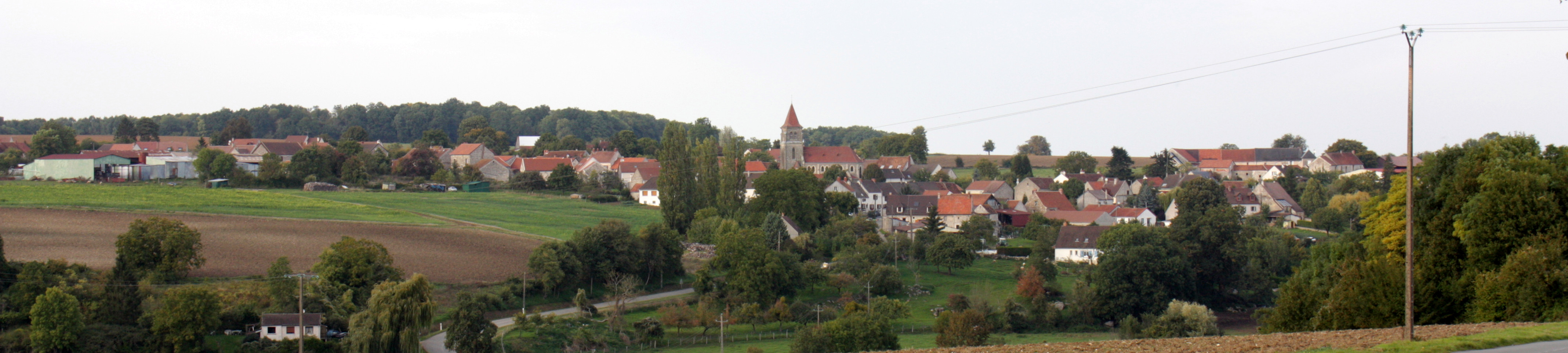
- A general view of Lucy-le-Bocage

- Coat of arms
- Location of Lucy-le-Bocage
- Location within France Location within Hauts-de-France
- Coordinates: 49°03′27″N 3°16′46″E
- Country: France
- Region: Hauts-de-France
- Department: Aisne
- Arrondissement: Château-Thierry
- Canton: Essômes-sur-Marne
- Intercommunality: Charly sur Marne

Government
  - Mayor (2026–32): Hervé Drouet
- Area^{1}: 7.75 km^{2} (2.99 sq mi)
- Elevation: 192 m (630 ft)
- Highest elevation: 208 m (682 ft)
- Lowest elevation: 138 m (453 ft)
- Population (2023): 202
  - Density: 26.1/km^{2} (67.5/sq mi)
- Time zone: UTC+01:00 (CET)
  - Summer (DST): UTC+02:00 (CEST)
- INSEE/Postal code: 02443 /02400
- ^{1} French Land Register data, which excludes lakes, ponds, glaciers > 1 km^{2} (0.386 sq mi or 247 acres) and river estuaries.

Lucy-le-Bocage (French pronunciation: [lysi lə bɔkaʒ]) is a commune in the Aisne department in Hauts-de-France in northern France.

== Population ==
Historical population
Year	Pop.	±% p.a.
1968	140	—
1975	124	−1.72%
1982	132	+0.90%
1990	141	+0.83%
1999	166	+1.83%
2007	176	+0.73%
2012	183	+0.78%
2017	195	+1.28%
2023	202	+0.59%
Source: INSEE

== See also ==
- Communes of the Aisne department
