= L'Épine-aux-Bois =

- Commune
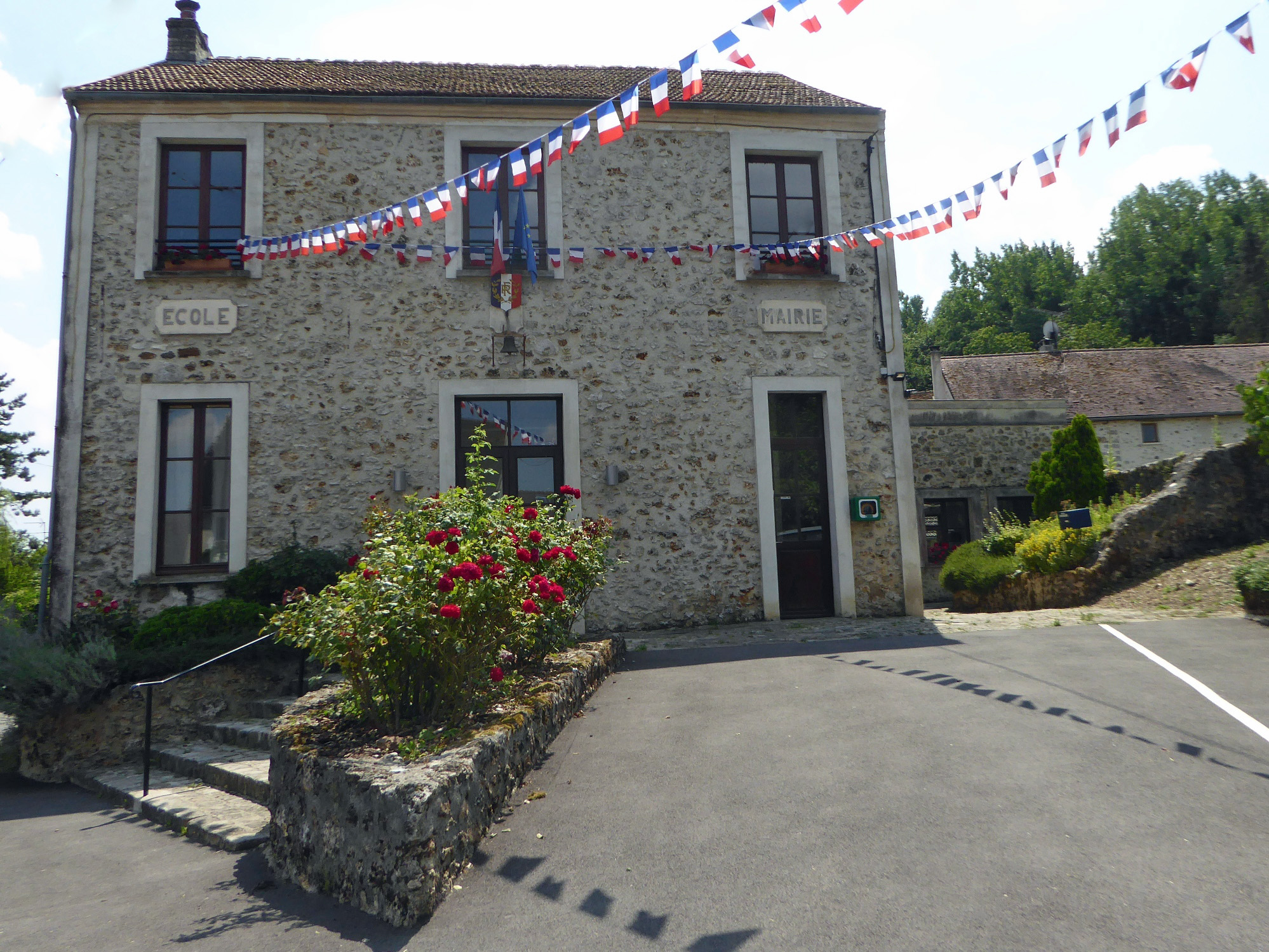
- The town hall of L'Épine-aux-Bois
- Location of L'Épine-aux-Bois
- Location within France Location within Hauts-de-France
- Coordinates: 48°53′10″N 3°26′58″E
- Country: France
- Region: Hauts-de-France
- Department: Aisne
- Arrondissement: Château-Thierry
- Canton: Essômes-sur-Marne
- Intercommunality: Canton de Charly-sur-Marne

Government
  - Mayor (2026–32): Nathalie Pierre
- Area^{1}: 12.37 km^{2} (4.78 sq mi)
- Elevation: 190 m (620 ft)
- Highest elevation: 221 m (725 ft)
- Lowest elevation: 149 m (489 ft)
- Population (2023): 241
  - Density: 19.5/km^{2} (50.5/sq mi)
- Time zone: UTC+01:00 (CET)
  - Summer (DST): UTC+02:00 (CEST)
- INSEE/Postal code: 02281 /02540
- ^{1} French Land Register data, which excludes lakes, ponds, glaciers > 1 km^{2} (0.386 sq mi or 247 acres) and river estuaries.

L'Épine-aux-Bois (French pronunciation: [lepin o bwa]) is a commune in the Aisne department in Hauts-de-France in northern France.

== Population ==
Historical population
Year	Pop.	±% p.a.
1968	179	—
1975	166	−1.07%
1982	152	−1.25%
1990	232	+5.43%
1999	231	−0.05%
2007	259	+1.44%
2012	261	+0.15%
2017	261	+0.00%
2023	241	−1.32%
Source: INSEE

== See also ==
- Communes of the Aisne department
