= Coupru =

- Commune
- Location of Coupru
- Location within France Location within Hauts-de-France
- Coordinates: 49°01′54″N 3°16′23″E
- Country: France
- Region: Hauts-de-France
- Department: Aisne
- Arrondissement: Château-Thierry
- Canton: Essômes-sur-Marne
- Intercommunality: Charly sur Marne

Government
  - Mayor (2026–32): Elisabeth Clobourse
- Area^{1}: 7.82 km^{2} (3.02 sq mi)
- Elevation: 100 m (330 ft)
- Highest elevation: 209 m (686 ft)
- Lowest elevation: 131 m (430 ft)
- Population (2023): 161
  - Density: 20.6/km^{2} (53.3/sq mi)
- Time zone: UTC+01:00 (CET)
  - Summer (DST): UTC+02:00 (CEST)
- INSEE/Postal code: 02221 /02310
- ^{1} French Land Register data, which excludes lakes, ponds, glaciers > 1 km^{2} (0.386 sq mi or 247 acres) and river estuaries.

Coupru (French pronunciation: [kupʁy]) is a commune in the Aisne department in Hauts-de-France in northern France.

== Population ==
Historical population
| Year | Pop. | ±% p.a. |
|---|---|---|
| 1968 | 124 | — |
| 1975 | 100 | −3.03% |
| 1982 | 98 | −0.29% |
| 1990 | 123 | +2.88% |
| 1999 | 144 | +1.77% |
| 2007 | 169 | +2.02% |
| 2012 | 195 | +2.90% |
| 2017 | 149 | −5.24% |
| 2023 | 161 | +1.30% |
Source: INSEE

== See also ==
- Communes of the Aisne department
