= Bézu-le-Guéry =

- Commune
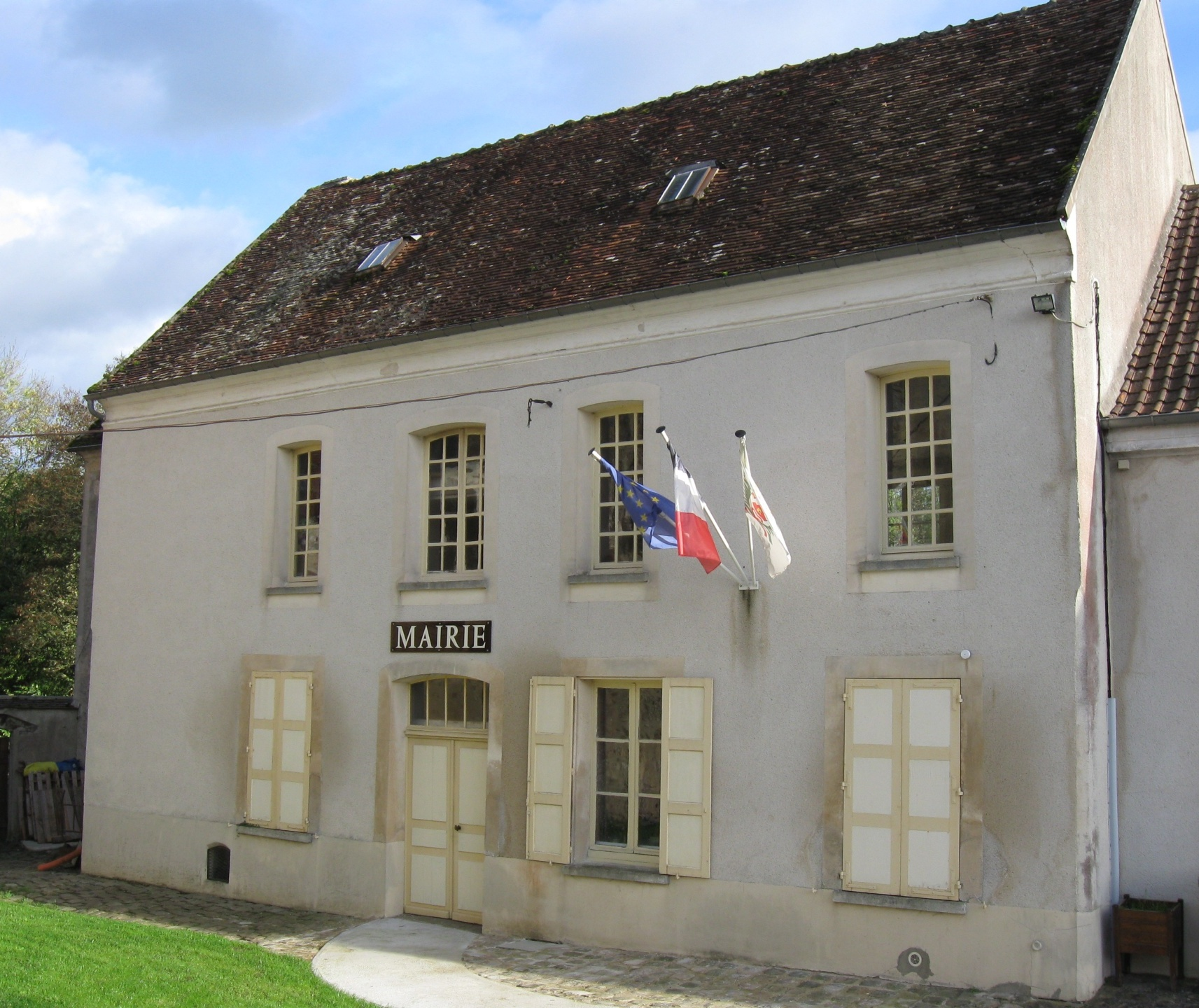
- Town hall

- Coat of arms
- Location of Bézu-le-Guéry
- Location within France Location within Hauts-de-France
- Coordinates: 49°00′31″N 3°13′33″E
- Country: France
- Region: Hauts-de-France
- Department: Aisne
- Arrondissement: Château-Thierry
- Canton: Essômes-sur-Marne
- Intercommunality: Charly sur Marne

Government
  - Mayor (2026–32): Nicolas Lefranc
- Area^{1}: 11.1 km^{2} (4.3 sq mi)
- Elevation: 170 m (560 ft)
- Highest elevation: 212 m (696 ft)
- Lowest elevation: 64 m (210 ft)
- Population (2023): 248
  - Density: 22.3/km^{2} (57.9/sq mi)
- Time zone: UTC+01:00 (CET)
  - Summer (DST): UTC+02:00 (CEST)
- INSEE/Postal code: 02084 /02310
- ^{1} French Land Register data, which excludes lakes, ponds, glaciers > 1 km^{2} (0.386 sq mi or 247 acres) and river estuaries.

Bézu-le-Guéry (French pronunciation: [bezy lə ɡeʁi]) is a commune in the department of Aisne in Hauts-de-France in northern France.

== Population ==
Historical population
Year	Pop.	±% p.a.
1968	153	—
1975	121	−3.30%
1982	138	+1.90%
1990	165	+2.26%
1999	204	+2.39%
2007	243	+2.21%
2012	260	+1.36%
2017	260	+0.00%
2023	248	−0.78%
Source: INSEE

== See also ==
- Communes of the Aisne department
