= Crouttes-sur-Marne =

- Commune
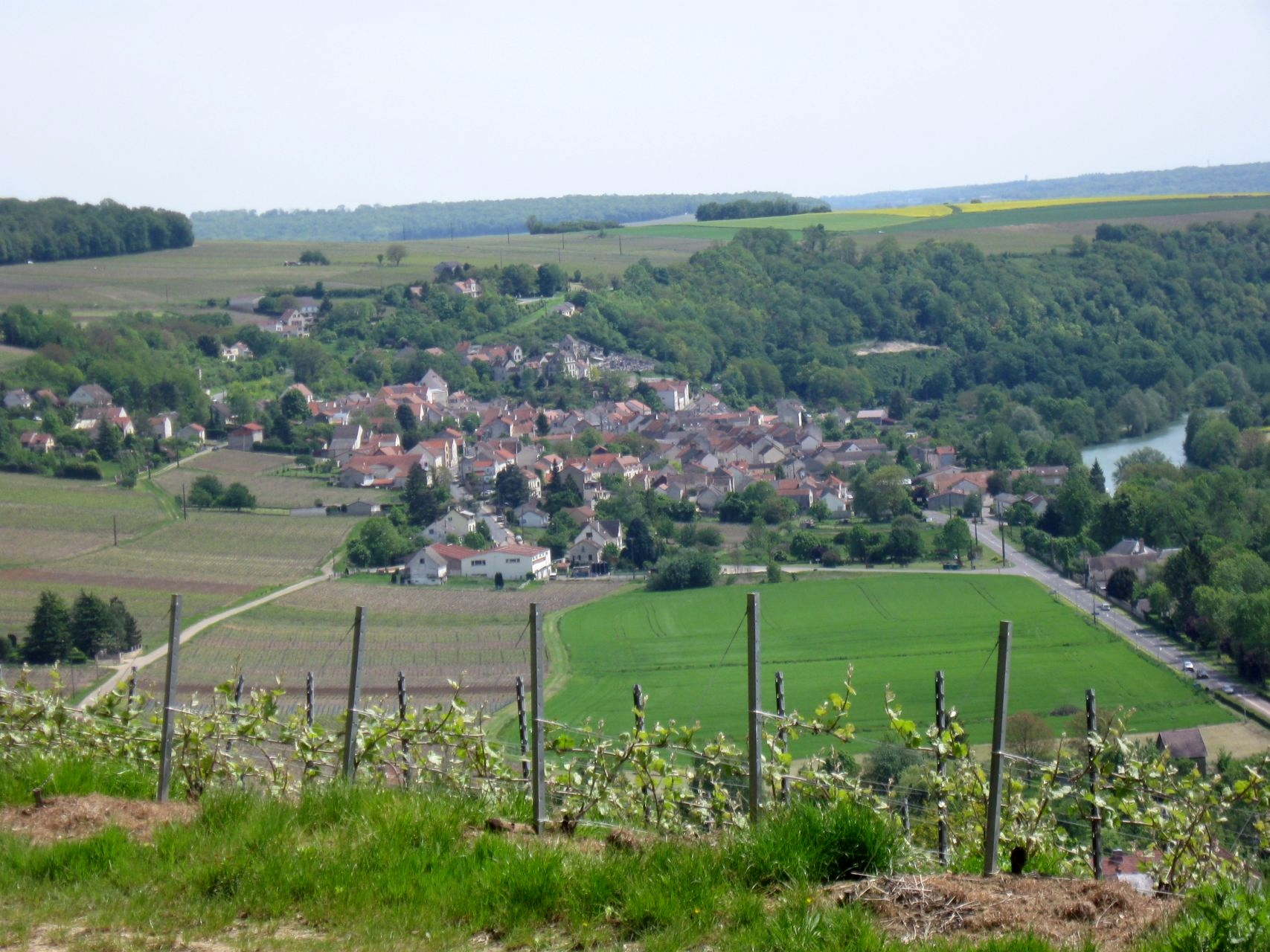
- A general view of Crouttes-sur-Marne

- Coat of arms
- Location of Crouttes-sur-Marne
- Location within France Location within Hauts-de-France
- Coordinates: 48°58′50″N 3°14′27″E
- Country: France
- Region: Hauts-de-France
- Department: Aisne
- Arrondissement: Château-Thierry
- Canton: Essômes-sur-Marne
- Intercommunality: Charly sur Marne

Government
  - Mayor (2026–32): Dany Baudoin
- Area^{1}: 4.33 km^{2} (1.67 sq mi)
- Elevation: 63 m (207 ft)
- Highest elevation: 201 m (659 ft)
- Lowest elevation: 54 m (177 ft)
- Population (2023): 591
  - Density: 136/km^{2} (354/sq mi)
- Time zone: UTC+01:00 (CET)
  - Summer (DST): UTC+02:00 (CEST)
- INSEE/Postal code: 02242 /02310
- ^{1} French Land Register data, which excludes lakes, ponds, glaciers > 1 km^{2} (0.386 sq mi or 247 acres) and river estuaries.

Crouttes-sur-Marne (French pronunciation: [kʁut syʁ maʁn], literally Crouttes on Marne) is a commune in the Aisne department in Hauts-de-France in northern France.

== Population ==
Historical population
Year	Pop.	±% p.a.
1968	559	—
1975	580	+0.53%
1982	565	−0.37%
1990	594	+0.63%
1999	628	+0.62%
2007	647	+0.37%
2012	642	−0.16%
2017	647	+0.16%
2023	591	−1.50%
Source: INSEE

== See also ==
- Communes of the Aisne department
