= Montfaucon, Aisne =

Montfaucon
- Commune
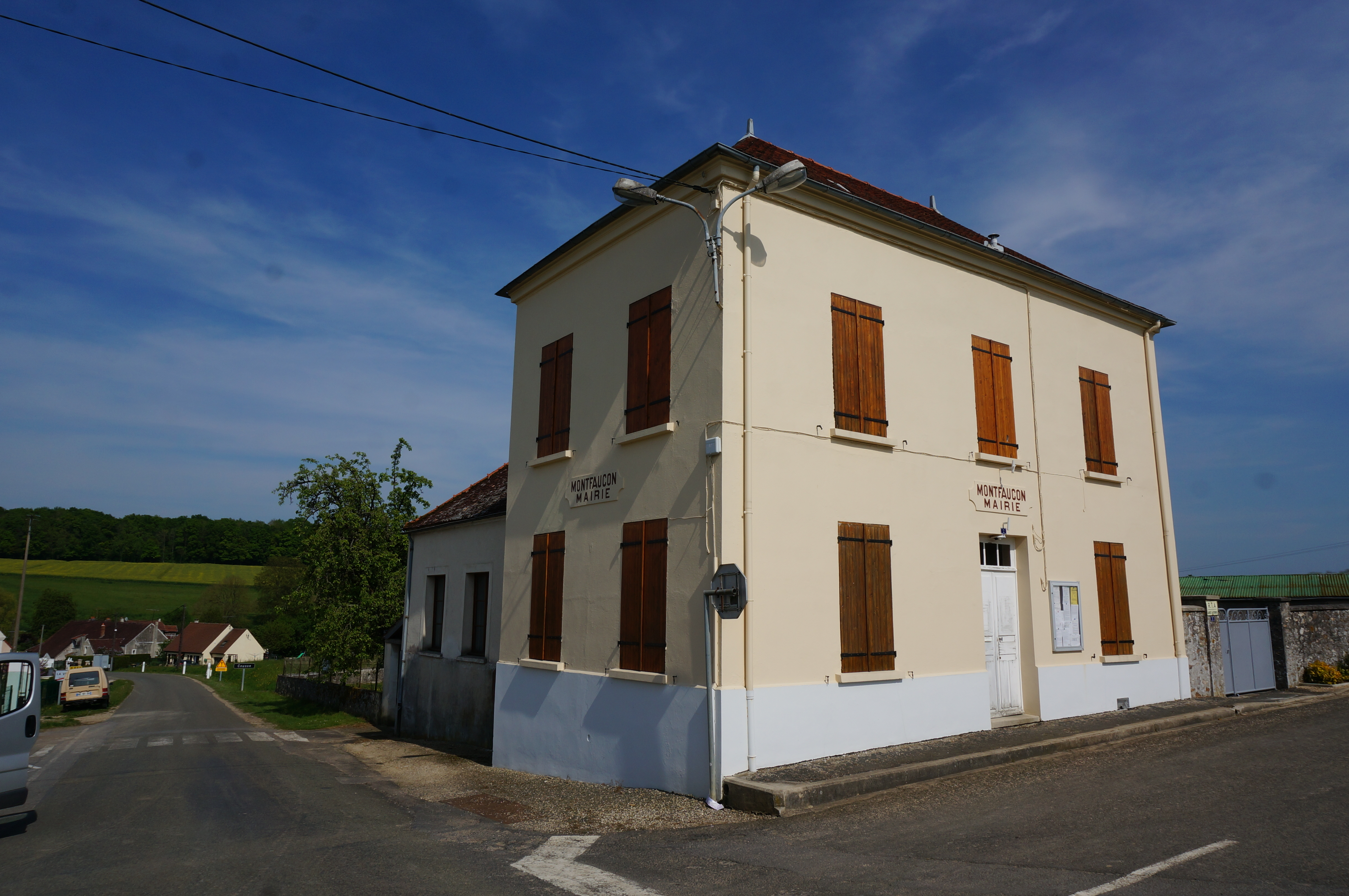
- The town hall of Montafaucon
- Location of Montfaucon
- Location within France Location within Hauts-de-France
- Coordinates: 48°56′38″N 3°25′51″E
- Country: France
- Region: Hauts-de-France
- Department: Aisne
- Arrondissement: Château-Thierry
- Canton: Essômes-sur-Marne
- Intercommunality: Charly sur Marne

Government
  - Mayor (2026–32): Jean-Pierre Vallon
- Area^{1}: 15.36 km^{2} (5.93 sq mi)
- Elevation: 175 m (574 ft)
- Highest elevation: 219 m (719 ft)
- Lowest elevation: 127 m (417 ft)
- Population (2023): 209
  - Density: 13.6/km^{2} (35.2/sq mi)
- Time zone: UTC+01:00 (CET)
  - Summer (DST): UTC+02:00 (CEST)
- INSEE/Postal code: 02505 /02540
- ^{1} French Land Register data, which excludes lakes, ponds, glaciers > 1 km^{2} (0.386 sq mi or 247 acres) and river estuaries.

Montfaucon (French pronunciation: [mɔ̃fokɔ̃]) is a commune in the Aisne department in Hauts-de-France in northern France.

== Population ==
Historical population
Year	Pop.	±% p.a.
1968	161	—
1975	139	−2.08%
1982	135	−0.42%
1990	163	+2.38%
1999	165	+0.14%
2007	172	+0.52%
2012	199	+2.96%
2017	203	+0.40%
2023	209	+0.49%
Source: INSEE

== See also ==
- Communes of the Aisne department

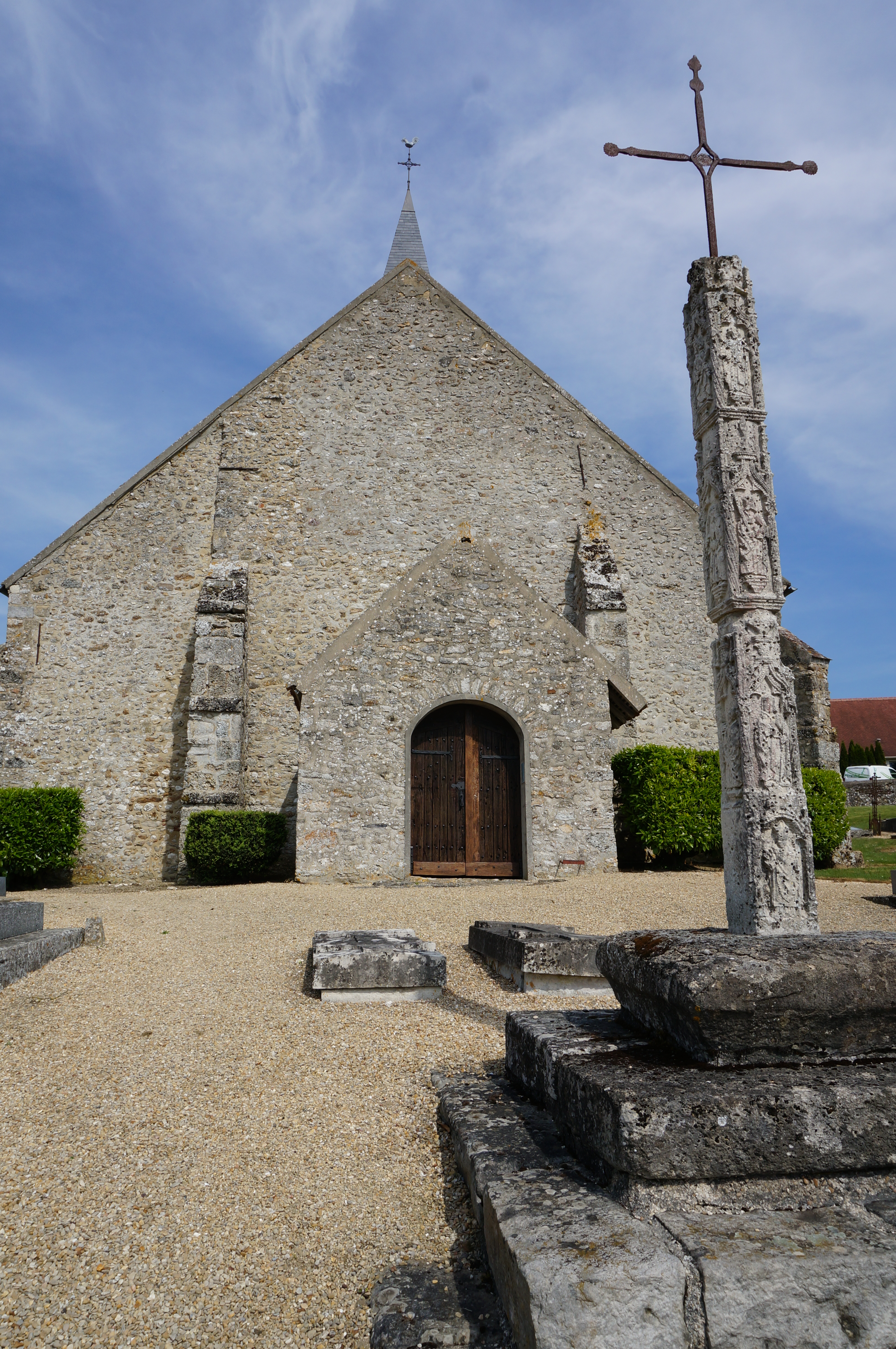
Church.
