= Essises =

- Commune
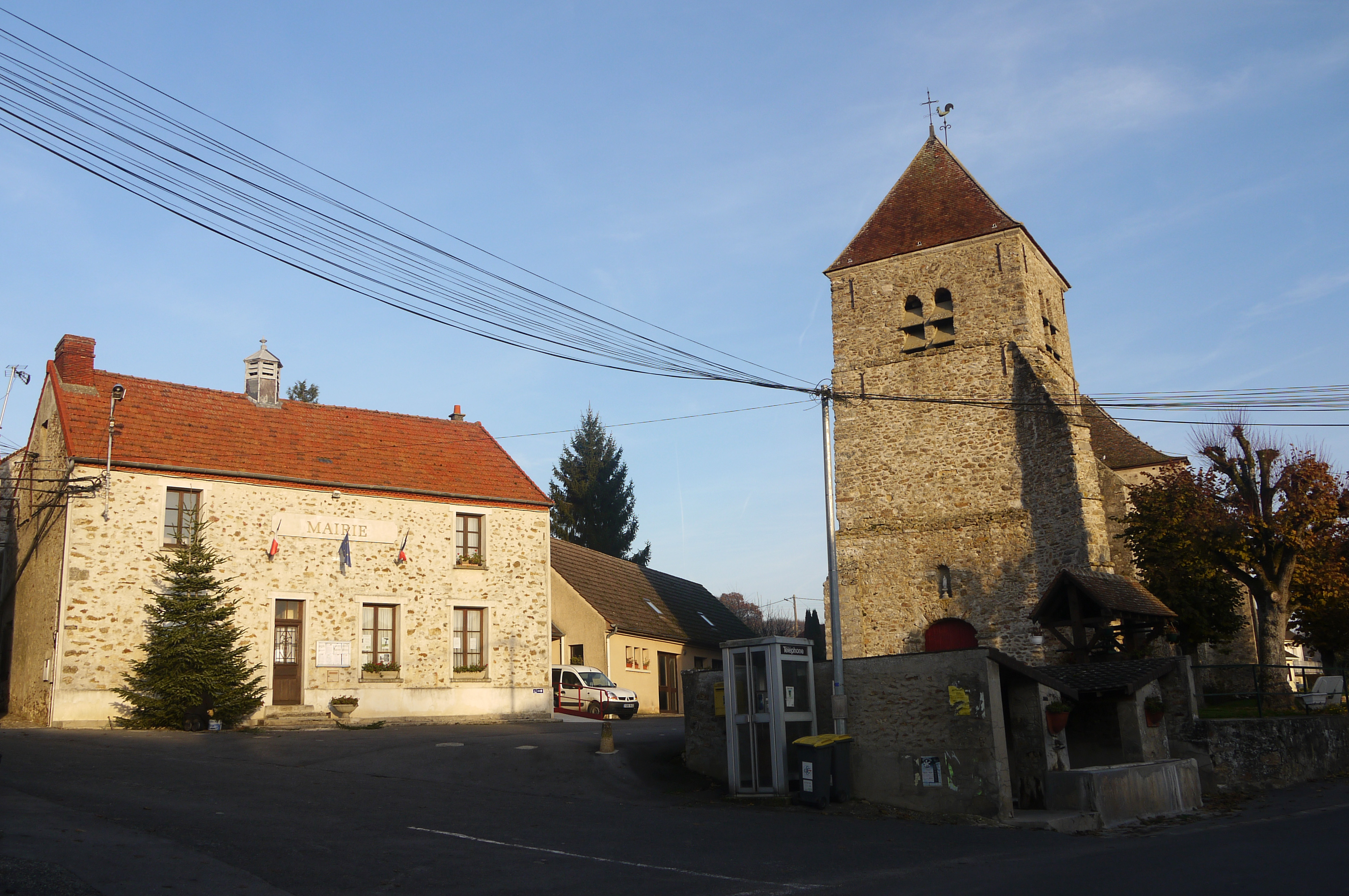
- The town hall and church of Essises
- Location of Essises
- Location within France Location within Hauts-de-France
- Coordinates: 48°57′45″N 3°25′15″E
- Country: France
- Region: Hauts-de-France
- Department: Aisne
- Arrondissement: Château-Thierry
- Canton: Essômes-sur-Marne
- Intercommunality: Charly sur Marne

Government
  - Mayor (2026–32): Michel Minette
- Area^{1}: 7.31 km^{2} (2.82 sq mi)
- Elevation: 128 m (420 ft)
- Highest elevation: 219 m (719 ft)
- Lowest elevation: 109 m (358 ft)
- Population (2023): 399
  - Density: 54.6/km^{2} (141/sq mi)
- Time zone: UTC+01:00 (CET)
  - Summer (DST): UTC+02:00 (CEST)
- INSEE/Postal code: 02289 /02570
- ^{1} French Land Register data, which excludes lakes, ponds, glaciers > 1 km^{2} (0.386 sq mi or 247 acres) and river estuaries.

Essises (French pronunciation: [esiz]) is a commune in the Aisne department in Hauts-de-France in northern France.

== Population ==
Historical population
| Year | Pop. | ±% p.a. |
|---|---|---|
| 1968 | 203 | — |
| 1975 | 177 | −1.94% |
| 1982 | 239 | +4.38% |
| 1990 | 325 | +3.92% |
| 1999 | 370 | +1.45% |
| 2007 | 423 | +1.69% |
| 2012 | 433 | +0.47% |
| 2017 | 417 | −0.75% |
| 2023 | 399 | −0.73% |
Source: INSEE

== See also ==
- Communes of the Aisne department
