= Vendières =

- Commune
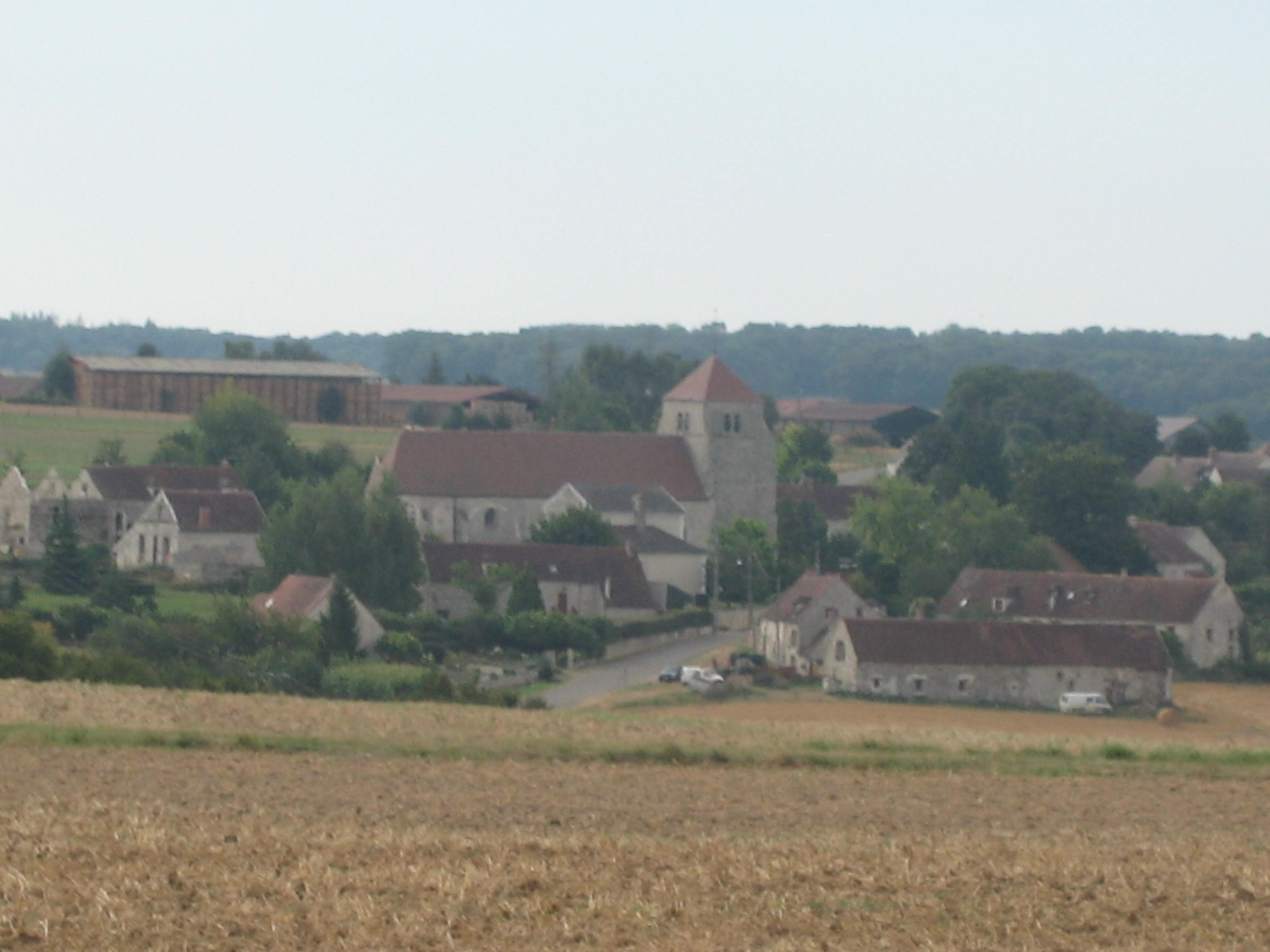
- A general view of Vendières
- Location of Vendières
- Location within France Location within Hauts-de-France
- Coordinates: 48°52′18″N 3°26′52″E
- Country: France
- Region: Hauts-de-France
- Department: Aisne
- Arrondissement: Château-Thierry
- Canton: Essômes-sur-Marne
- Intercommunality: Charly sur Marne

Government
  - Mayor (2026–32): Christian Verlaguet
- Area^{1}: 12.35 km^{2} (4.77 sq mi)
- Elevation: 150 m (490 ft)
- Highest elevation: 209 m (686 ft)
- Lowest elevation: 102 m (335 ft)
- Population (2023): 133
  - Density: 10.8/km^{2} (27.9/sq mi)
- Time zone: UTC+01:00 (CET)
  - Summer (DST): UTC+02:00 (CEST)
- INSEE/Postal code: 02777 /02540
- ^{1} French Land Register data, which excludes lakes, ponds, glaciers > 1 km^{2} (0.386 sq mi or 247 acres) and river estuaries.

Vendières (French pronunciation: [vɑ̃djɛʁ]) is a commune in the Aisne department in Hauts-de-France in northern France.

== Population ==
Historical population
Year	Pop.	±% p.a.
1968	146	—
1975	128	−1.86%
1982	123	−0.57%
1990	121	−0.20%
1999	123	+0.18%
2007	137	+1.36%
2012	156	+2.63%
2017	160	+0.51%
2023	133	−3.03%
Source: INSEE

== See also ==
- Communes of the Aisne department
