= Canton of Essômes-sur-Marne =

Coordinates: 49.03°N 3.34°E

- Canton
- Situation of the canton of Essômes-sur-Marne in the department of Aisne
- Country: France
- Region: Hauts-de-France
- Department: Aisne
- No. of communes: {{{nbcomm}}}
- Population (2023): 28,654
- INSEE code: 0204

The canton of Essômes-sur-Marne is an administrative division of the Aisne department, in northern France. It was created at the French canton reorganisation which came into effect in March 2015. Its seat is in Essômes-sur-Marne.

It consists of the following communes:

1. Azy-sur-Marne
2. Barzy-sur-Marne
3. Bézu-le-Guéry
4. Bonneil
5. Celles-lès-Condé
6. La Chapelle-sur-Chézy
7. Charly-sur-Marne
8. Chartèves
9. Chézy-sur-Marne
10. Condé-en-Brie
11. Connigis
12. Coupru
13. Courboin
14. Courtemont-Varennes
15. Crézancy
16. Crouttes-sur-Marne
17. Dhuys-et-Morin-en-Brie
18. Domptin
19. L'Épine-aux-Bois
20. Essises
21. Essômes-sur-Marne
22. Jaulgonne
23. Lucy-le-Bocage
24. Marigny-en-Orxois
25. Mézy-Moulins
26. Montfaucon
27. Monthurel
28. Montigny-lès-Condé
29. Montlevon
30. Montreuil-aux-Lions
31. Nogentel
32. Nogent-l'Artaud
33. Pargny-la-Dhuys
34. Passy-sur-Marne
35. Pavant
36. Reuilly-Sauvigny
37. Romeny-sur-Marne
38. Rozoy-Bellevalle
39. Saint-Eugène
40. Saulchery
41. Trélou-sur-Marne
42. Vallées-en-Champagne
43. Vendières
44. Veuilly-la-Poterie
45. Viels-Maisons
46. Viffort
47. Villiers-Saint-Denis
