= Domptin =

- Commune
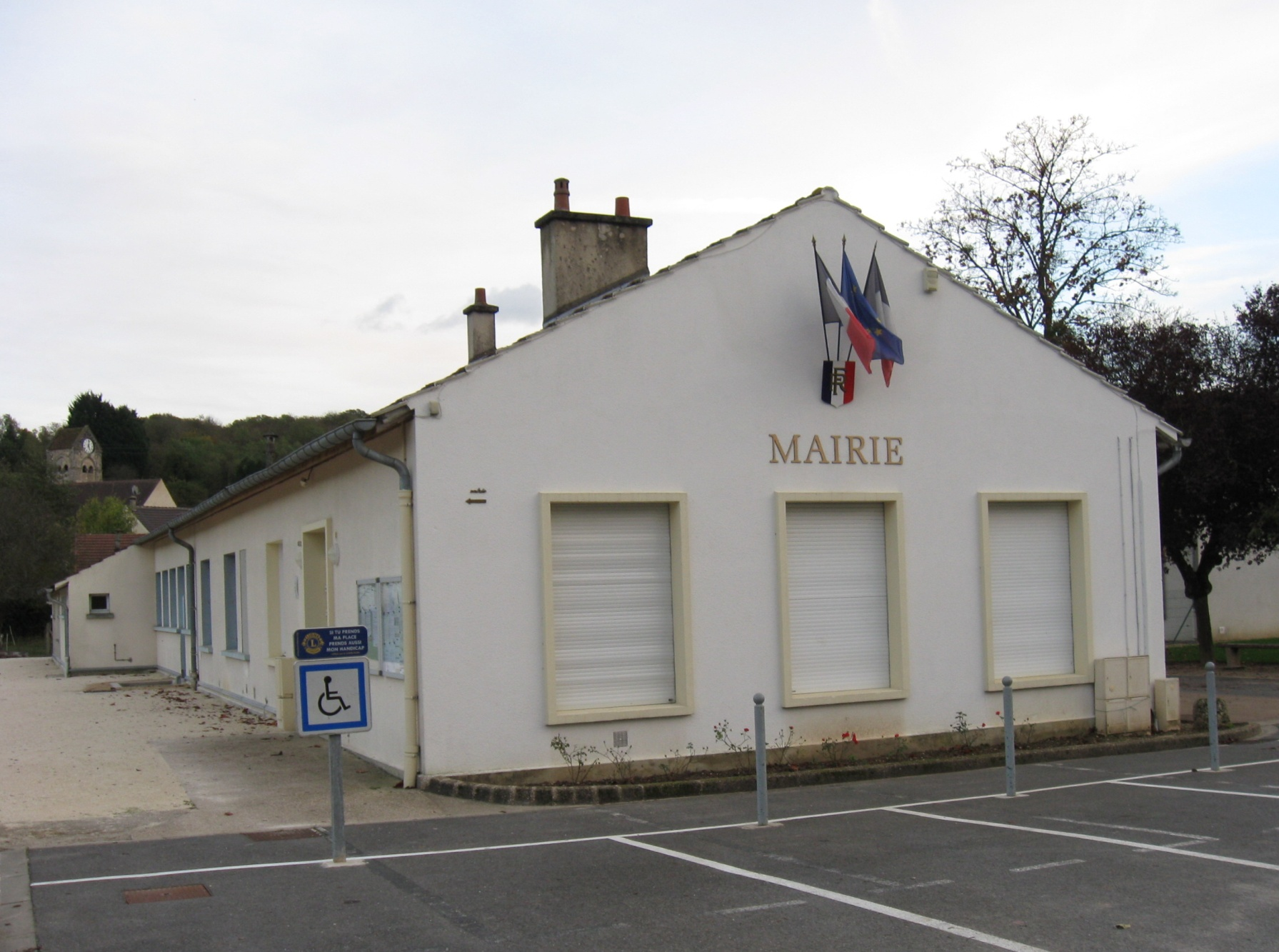
- The town hall of Domptin
- Location of Domptin
- Location within France Location within Hauts-de-France
- Coordinates: 49°01′02″N 3°16′40″E
- Country: France
- Region: Hauts-de-France
- Department: Aisne
- Arrondissement: Château-Thierry
- Canton: Essômes-sur-Marne
- Intercommunality: Charly sur Marne

Government
  - Mayor (2026–32): Emeric Luquin
- Area^{1}: 4.56 km^{2} (1.76 sq mi)
- Elevation: 118 m (387 ft)
- Highest elevation: 203 m (666 ft)
- Lowest elevation: 102 m (335 ft)
- Population (2023): 654
  - Density: 143/km^{2} (371/sq mi)
- Time zone: UTC+01:00 (CET)
  - Summer (DST): UTC+02:00 (CEST)
- INSEE/Postal code: 02268 /02310
- ^{1} French Land Register data, which excludes lakes, ponds, glaciers > 1 km^{2} (0.386 sq mi or 247 acres) and river estuaries.

Domptin is a commune in the Aisne department in Hauts-de-France in northern France.

== Population ==
Historical population
Year	Pop.	±% p.a.
1968	219	—
1975	223	+0.26%
1982	300	+4.33%
1990	420	+4.30%
1999	530	+2.62%
2007	631	+2.20%
2012	668	+1.15%
2017	654	−0.42%
2023	654	+0.00%
Source: INSEE

== See also ==
- Communes of the Aisne department
