= Chézy-sur-Marne =

- Commune
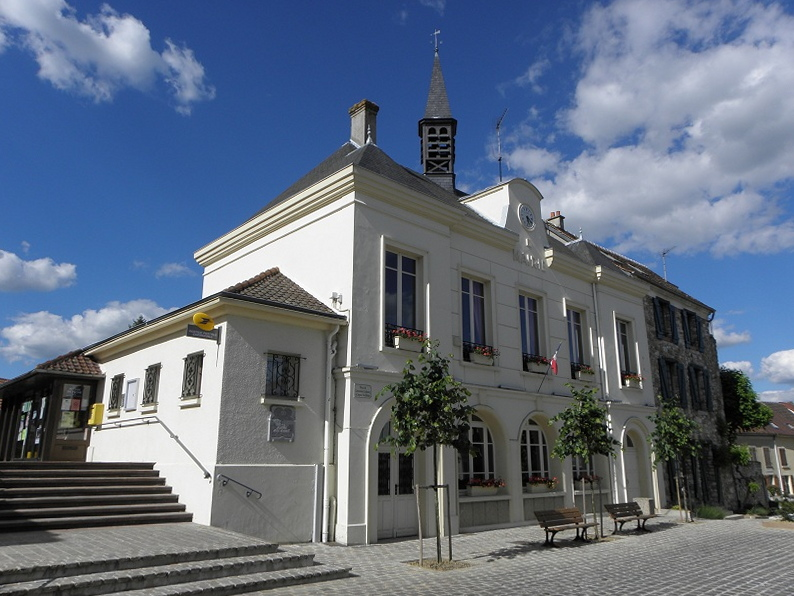
- Town hall
- Location of Chézy-sur-Marne
- Location within France Location within Hauts-de-France
- Coordinates: 48°59′19″N 3°22′05″E
- Country: France
- Region: Hauts-de-France
- Department: Aisne
- Arrondissement: Château-Thierry
- Canton: Essômes-sur-Marne
- Intercommunality: Charly sur Marne

Government
  - Mayor (2026–32): Sandra Jaget
- Area^{1}: 22.43 km^{2} (8.66 sq mi)
- Elevation: 64 m (210 ft)
- Highest elevation: 220 m (720 ft)
- Lowest elevation: 57 m (187 ft)
- Population (2023): 1,296
  - Density: 57.78/km^{2} (149.6/sq mi)
- Time zone: UTC+01:00 (CET)
  - Summer (DST): UTC+02:00 (CEST)
- INSEE/Postal code: 02186 /02570
- ^{1} French Land Register data, which excludes lakes, ponds, glaciers > 1 km^{2} (0.386 sq mi or 247 acres) and river estuaries.

Chézy-sur-Marne (French pronunciation: [ʃezi syʁ maʁn], literally Chézy on Marne) is a commune in the Aisne department in Hauts-de-France in northern France.

== 2009 flood ==
The town was hit by a flash flood and mudslide on 14 June 2009 after a violent localised storm. Cars were floated downstream, cellars and ground-floor rooms in low-lying houses were flooded. Adjacent localities were also affected.

== Population ==
Historical population
Year	Pop.	±% p.a.
1968	1,013	—
1975	1,113	+1.35%
1982	1,262	+1.81%
1990	1,257	−0.05%
1999	1,323	+0.57%
2007	1,325	+0.02%
2012	1,305	−0.30%
2017	1,353	+0.73%
2023	1,296	−0.71%
Source: INSEE

== See also ==
- Communes of the Aisne department
- Académie Charles Cros
