= 51st Highland Volunteers =

British Army battalion

51st Highland, 7th Battalion The Royal Regiment of Scotland
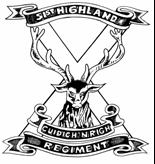
- Badge of the Regiment
- Active: 1967 – Present
- Country: United Kingdom
- Branch: British Army
- Type: Line Infantry
- Role: Army Reserve Light Infantry
- Size: Battalion; 471 personnel
- Part of: 51st Infantry Brigade and Headquarters Scotland
- Garrison/HQ: Headquarters in Perth
- Nickname: 7 SCOTS
- Motto: Nemo Me Impune Lacessit (No One Assails Me With Impunity) (Latin)
- March: Quick - Scotland the Brave; Slow - The Garb of Auld Gaul

Commanders
- Royal Colonel: The King
- Honorary Colonel: Major General Patrick Marriott, CB, CBE, DL

Insignia
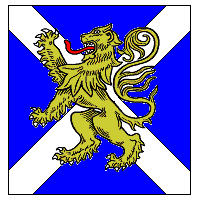
- Tactical Recognition Flash
- Tartan: Government
- Hackle: Purple

The 51st Highland Volunteers (51 HIGHLAND) is a battalion in the British Army's Army Reserve or reserve force in the Scottish Highlands, forming the 7th Battalion of the Royal Regiment of Scotland, also known as 7 SCOTS. It is one of two Reserve battalions in the Royal Regiment of Scotland, along with 52nd Lowland (6 SCOTS), a similar unit located in the Scottish Lowlands.

Originally formed as the 51st Highland Volunteers in 1967, as a result of the amalgamation of Territorial Battalions within the infantry Regiments of the Highland Brigade, the name commemorated the 51st (Highland) Division of the Territorial Force, within which many of the Regiment's antecedent Territorial Battalions served during the First and Second World Wars.

== History ==
=== Origins and First World War ===
The current Battalion traces its lineage back to the reserve Rifle Volunteer units that were originally raised in the Scottish Highlands as part of the Victorian Volunteer Force by Lord Lieutenants in every county. These included Highland units from the north-west of Scotland such as the Argyllshire Rifle Volunteers, the Inverness-shire Rifle Volunteers, the Ross-shire Rifle Volunteers and the Sutherland Rifle Volunteers. However, the lineage also includes elements of the Forfarshire Rifle Volunteers, the Perthshire Rifle Volunteers, the Fifeshire Rifle Volunteers, the Elginshire Rifle Volunteers, the Aberdeenshire Rifle Volunteers, the Banffshire Rifle Volunteers, the Renfrewshire Rifle Volunteers, and the Clackmannanshire Rifle Volunteers.

The current unit is the direct descendant of the infantry battalions that made up the 51st (Highland) Division, of which Highland Rifle Volunteer units became a part. This division was formed as part of the Haldane Reforms, which integrated the Volunteer Force, Militia and the Yeomanry into the nascent Territorial Force, created by the Territorial and Reserve Forces Act 1907.

The Black Watch (TF Battalions), c. 1908	The Seaforth Highlanders (TF Battalions), c. 1908	The Queen's Own Cameron Highlanders (TF Battalions), c. 1908	The Gordon Highlanders (TF Battalions), c. 1908	The Argyll and Sutherland Highlanders (TF Battalions), c. 1908
4th (City of Dundee) Battalion, The Black Watch, at Parker Street in Dundee (since demolished)	4th (Ross-shire) Battalion, The Seaforth Highlanders, at Ferry Road in Dingwall	4th Battalion, The Queen's Own Cameron Highlanders, at Rose Street in Inverness	4th (The City of Aberdeen) Battalion, The Gordon Highlanders, at Guild Street in Aberdeen	5th (Renfrewshire) Battalion, The Argyll and Sutherland Highlanders, at Finnart Street in Greenock (since demolished)
5th (Angus and Dundee) Battalion, The Black Watch, at Bank Street in Brechin	5th (The Sutherland and Caithness Highland) Battalion, The Seaforth Highlanders, at Old Bank Road in Golspie		5th (Buchan and Formartin) Battalion, The Gordon Highlanders, in Kirk Street in Peterhead (since demolished)	6th (Renfrewshire) Battalion, The Argyll and Sutherland Highlanders, at High Street in Paisley
6th (Perthshire) Battalion, The Black Watch, at Tay Street in Perth (since demolished)	6th (Morayshire) Battalion, The Seaforth Highlanders, at Cooper Park in Elgin		6th (The Banff and Donside) Battalion, The Gordon Highlanders, at Union Street in Keith	7th Battalion, The Argyll and Sutherland Highlanders, at Princes Street in Stirling
7th (Fife) Battalion, The Black Watch, at Market Street / City Road in St Andrews (since demolished)			7th (Deeside Highland) Battalion, The Gordon Highlanders, at Kinneskie Road in Banchory	8th (Argyllshire) Battalion, The Argyll and Sutherland Highlanders, at Queen Street in Dunoon (since demolished)
8th (Cyclist) Battalion, The Black Watch, at Perth Road in Birnam				9th (Dunbartonshire) Battalion, The Argyll and Sutherland Highlanders, at Hartfield House in Dumbarton

These units saw action as part of 51st Highland Division at the Battle of the Somme, the Battle of Arras, the Third Battle of Ypres and the Battle of Cambrai in France during the First World War.

=== Interwar period and Second World War ===
After the Armistice, the Territorial Force and its formations were disbanded. It was re-established, by the Territorial Army and Militia Act 1921, as the Territorial Army however, and the original Highland Territorial Battalions were reconstituted, although there were several amalgamations.

The Black Watch (TA Battalions), c. 1921	The Seaforth Highlanders (TA Battalions), c. 1921	The Queen's Own Cameron Highlanders (TA Battalions), c. 1921	The Gordon Highlanders (TA Battalions), c. 1921	The Argyll and Sutherland Highlanders (TF Battalions), c. 1921
4th/5th (Dundee and Angus) Battalion, The Black Watch, at Parker Street in Dundee	4th/5th (Ross, Sutherland and Caithness) Battalion, The Seaforth Highlanders, at Old Bank Road in Golspie	4th Battalion, The Queen's Own Cameron Highlanders, at Rose Street in Inverness	4th (The City of Aberdeen) Battalion, The Gordon Highlanders, at Guild Street in Aberdeen	5th/6th (Renfrewshire) Battalion, The Argyll and Sutherland Highlanders, at High Street, Paisley
6th/7th (Perth and Fife) Battalion, The Black Watch, at Tay Street in Perth	6th (Morayshire) Battalion, The Seaforth Highlanders, at Cooper Park in Elgin		5th/7th (Buchan, Mar and Means) Battalion, The Gordon Highlanders, at Mugiemoss Road in Bucksburn (since demolished)	7th Battalion, The Argyll and Sutherland Highlanders, at Princes Street in Stirling
				8th (Argyllshire) Battalion, The Argyll and Sutherland Highlanders, at Queen Street in Dunoon

During the Second World War these units again saw action as part of 51st (Highland) Infantry Division but many troops were detained as prisoners of war in Germany after more than 10,000 members of the division were taken prisoner at St Valery.

=== Post-war restructuring and Cold War ===
In August 1946 the 51st (Highland) Division was disbanded. Shortly afterwards however the formation was revived as part of the 51st/52nd (Scottish) Division, created via an amalgamation with the 52nd (Lowland) Division. They once again became a Territorial Division upon demobilisation in 1948.

The Black Watch (TA Battalions), c. 1947	The Seaforth Highlanders (TA Battalions), c. 1947	The Queen's Own Cameron Highlanders (TA Battalions), c. 1947	The Gordon Highlanders (TA Battalions), c. 1947	The Argyll and Sutherland Highlanders (TA Battalions), c. 1947
4th/5th (Dundee and Angus) Battalion, The Black Watch, at Parker Street in Dundee	11th (Ross-shire) Battalion, The Seaforth Highlanders, at Ferry Road in Dingwall	4th Battalion, The Queen's Own Cameron Highlanders, at Rose Street in Inverness	4th/7th Battalion, The Gordon Highlanders, at Guild Street in Aberdeen	7th Battalion, The Argyll and Sutherland Highlanders, at Princes Street in Stirling
6th/7th (Perth and Fife) Battalion, The Black Watch, at Tay Street in Perth			5th/6th (Banff, Buchan and Donside) Battalion, The Gordon Highlanders, at Mugiemoss Road in Bucksburn	8th (Argyllshire) Battalion, The Argyll and Sutherland Highlanders, at Queen Street in Dunoon

In 1950, the 51st/52nd (Scottish) Division was split, restoring the independence of the 51st Highland Division, which took regional command of Territorial Army units based in the Scottish Highlands, including the TA infantry battalions of the Highland Brigade regiments.

British forces contracted dramatically as the end of National Service took place in 1960, as announced in the 1957 Defence White Paper. As a result, on 20 July 1960, a reorganisation of the TA was announced by the War Office.

The Black Watch (TA Battalions), c. 1961	The Queen's Own Highlanders (Seaforth and Camerons) (TA Battalions), c. 1961	The Gordon Highlanders (TA Battalions), c. 1961	The Argyll and Sutherland Highlanders (TA Battalions), c. 1961
4th/5th (Dundee and Angus) Battalion, The Black Watch, at Parker Street in Dundee	11th (Ross-shire) Battalion, The Seaforth Highlanders, at Ferry Road in Dingwall	3rd Battalion, The Gordon Highlanders, at Guild Street in Aberdeen	7th Battalion, The Argyll and Sutherland Highlanders, at Princes Street in Stirling
6th/7th (Perth and Fife) Battalion, The Black Watch, at Tay Street in Perth			8th (Argyllshire) Battalion, The Argyll and Sutherland Highlanders, at Queen Street in Dunoon

=== The 1966 Defence White Paper and after ===
This was followed by complete reorganisation as announced in the 1966 Defence White Paper. The 51st Highland Volunteers were formed in 1967 from the amalgamation of territorial battalions of regiments in the Highland Brigade. It was a TAVR II (NATO reserve role) unit with headquarters located at Perth, Scotland.

51st Highland Volunteers c.1967

- HQ (Black Watch) Company, located at Perth
- A (Black Watch) Company, located at Dundee
- B (Seaforth Highlanders) Company, located at Wick
- C (Queen's Own Cameron Highlanders) Company, located at Inverness
- D (Gordon Highlanders) Company, located at Aberdeen
- E (Argyll and Sutherland Highlanders) Company, located at Stirling
- G (London Scottish) Company, located at London
- V (Liverpool Scottish) Company, located at Liverpool

In 1969, the three TAVRIII (Home defence) battalions were reduced in size and amalgamated into the 51st Highland Volunteers, forming three additional companies:

- No.1 (Lovat Scouts) Company, located at Kirkwall and Lerwick
- No.2 (Queen's Own Highlanders) Company, located at Fort William and Stornoway
- No.3 (Argyll and Sutherland Highlanders) Company, located at Dumbarton and Campbeltown

On 1 April 1971, the 51st Highland Volunteers split into two battalions. A third battalion was subsequently formed on 1 April 1975.

51st Highland Volunteers c. 1975

- 1st Battalion, 51st Highland Volunteers
  - Headquarters located at Perth
  - A (The Black Watch) Company, located at Dundee
  - B (The Black Watch) Company, located at Kirkcaldy
  - C (The Argyll and Sutherland Highlanders) Company, located at Grangemouth, formed from the cadre of the 3rd Bn Argyll and Sutherland Highlanders
  - E (The Argyll and Sutherland Highlanders) Company, located at Stirling
  - G (The London Scottish) Company, located at Westminster, London
  - V (The Liverpool Scottish) Company, located at Liverpool
- 2nd Battalion, 51st Highland Volunteers
  - Headquarters located at Elgin
  - A (Lovat Scouts) Company, located on Orkney and Shetland
  - B (Queen's Own Highlanders) Company, located at Wick
  - C (Queen's Own Highlanders) Company, located at Inverness, Nairn, Dingwall, Fort William
  - D (Gordon Highlanders) Company, located at Aberdeen, Laurencekirk
  - G (Gordon Highlanders) Company, located at Peterhead, Keith
- 3rd Battalion, 51st Highland Volunteers
  - Headquarters located at Peterhead
  - B (Queen's Own Highlanders) Company, located at Wick
  - C (Argyll and Sutherland Highlanders) Company, located at Grangemouth
  - D (Argyll and Sutherland Highlanders) Company, located at Dumbarton

In 1981, the 3rd Battalion effectively became the Territorial battalion of the Argyll and Sutherland Highlanders; in 1995, it became the 7th/8th (V) Battalion of that regiment. The 2nd Battalion became the 3rd (V) Battalion of The Highlanders.

A Z (Home Service Force) Company was formed in 1984 at Perth, Kirkcaldy and Dundee. A number of re-organizations and company re-locations also occurred in the 1980s. Between 1992 and 1993, the remaining elements of 1st Battalion, the 51st Highland Volunteers were again reorganised.

51st Highland Volunteers c.1993

- HQ Company at Perth
- A Company at Dundee
- B Company at Forfar
- D Company at Aberdeen
- K Company at Kirkcaldy

The 1st Battalion was subsequently redesignated (in 1994) as the 3rd (Volunteer) Battalion, The Black Watch (Royal Highland Regiment).

The regiment was re-formed in 1999 by the amalgamation of all three battalions (viz 7/8 Argyll and Sutherland Highlanders, 3 The Highlanders, and 3 Black Watch) into a single battalion, the 51st Highland Regiment (51 HIGHLAND), in consequence of the reforms of the Territorial Army in the Strategic Defence Review. It had one support company and five rifle companies.

51st Highland Regiment c.1999

- HQ Company at Perth
- A (Black Watch) Company at Dundee and Kirkcaldy
- B (Highlanders) Company at Peterhead, Aberdeen, Elgin, Keith and Lerwick
- C (Highlanders) Company at Inverness, Wick, Kirkwall and Stornoway
- D (Argyll and Sutherland Highlanders) Company at Dumbarton and Dunoon
- E (Argyll and Sutherland Highlanders) Company at Cumbernauld and Assault Pioneer platoon at Stirling.

As part of the Delivering Security in a Changing World review of the British Army, on 28 March 2006, the 51st Highland Regiment became the 7th Battalion, The Royal Regiment of Scotland (also known as (7 SCOTS)).

== Current structure and operations ==
The battalion headquarters is based at Queen's Barracks in Perth. The Highland Band of the Royal Regiment of Scotland (Reserve) is administered by the battalion, as well as the unit's own battalion Pipes and Drums. Under the Army 2020 Refine, the battalion was paired with 3 SCOTS as a light infantry battalion. The battalion is currently made up of one support company and three rifle companies:

51st Highland Volunteers, 7th Battalion c.2021

- Battalion Headquarters, at Queen's Barracks, Perth
  - Highland Band of the Royal Regiment of Scotland
- Headquarters (Black Watch) Company, at Queen's Barracks, Perth
- A (Black Watch) Company, at Oliver Barracks, Dundee
  - Rifle Platoon, at Gordon Barracks, Aberdeen
  - Rifle Platoon, in Kirkcaldy
- C (Highlanders) Company, in Inverness
  - Platoon, in Stornoway, Isle of Lewis
- D (Argylls) Company, in Dumbarton
  - Platoon, in Stirling

== Lineage ==
Lineage
51st Highland, 7th Battalion, The Royal Regiment of Scotland	51st Highland Regiment	3rd (Volunteer) Battalion, The Black Watch	1st Battalion, 51st Highland Volunteers	51st Highland Volunteers (TAVR II and III)	6th/7th Battalion, The Black Watch
51st Highland, 7th Battalion, The Royal Regiment of Scotland	51st Highland Regiment	3rd (Volunteer) Battalion, The Black Watch	1st Battalion, 51st Highland Volunteers	51st Highland Volunteers (TAVR II and III)	4th/5th Battalion, The Black Watch
51st Highland, 7th Battalion, The Royal Regiment of Scotland	51st Highland Regiment	3rd (Volunteer) Battalion, The Black Watch	1st Battalion, 51st Highland Volunteers	51st Highland Volunteers (TAVR II and III)	1st Battalion, The Liverpool Scottish
51st Highland, 7th Battalion, The Royal Regiment of Scotland	51st Highland Regiment	3rd (Volunteer) Battalion, The Highlanders (Seaforth, Gordons and Camerons)	2nd Battalion, 51st Highland Volunteers	51st Highland Volunteers (TAVR II and III)	11th Battalion, Seaforth Highlanders
51st Highland, 7th Battalion, The Royal Regiment of Scotland	51st Highland Regiment	3rd (Volunteer) Battalion, The Highlanders (Seaforth, Gordons and Camerons)	2nd Battalion, 51st Highland Volunteers	51st Highland Volunteers (TAVR II and III)	4th/5th Battalion, The Queen's Own Cameron Highlanders
51st Highland, 7th Battalion, The Royal Regiment of Scotland	51st Highland Regiment	3rd (Volunteer) Battalion, The Highlanders (Seaforth, Gordons and Camerons)	2nd Battalion, 51st Highland Volunteers	51st Highland Volunteers (TAVR II and III)	1st Battalion, The London Scottish
51st Highland, 7th Battalion, The Royal Regiment of Scotland	51st Highland Regiment	7/8th (Volunteer) Battalion, Argyll and Sutherland Highlanders	3rd Battalion, 51st Highland Volunteers	51st Highland Volunteers (TAVR II and III)	3rd Battalion, The Gordon Highlanders
51st Highland, 7th Battalion, The Royal Regiment of Scotland	51st Highland Regiment	7/8th (Volunteer) Battalion, Argyll and Sutherland Highlanders	3rd Battalion, 51st Highland Volunteers	51st Highland Volunteers (TAVR II and III)	7th and 8th Battalions, The Argyll and Sutherland Highlanders

== See also ==
- Armed forces in Scotland
- Military history of Scotland
