= Hatfield (surname) =

Hatfield is a surname. Notable people with this surname include:

- Abraham Hatfield (1867–1957), American philatelist
- Barbara Hatfield (born 1935), American politician
- Bobby Hatfield (1940–2003), American singer-songwriter, one half of the duo The Righteous Brothers
- Brian Hatfield, politician from Washington State
- Charles Hatfield (1875–1958), American "rainmaker"
- Charles Sherrod Hatfield (1882–1950), American judge
- Dasher Hatfield, American professional wrestler
- Devil Anse Hatfield, Patriarch during the infamous Hatfield-McCoy Feud
- Dominique Hatfield (born 1994), American football player
- Donald Hatfield, English rugby league footballer who played in the 1940s, 1950s and 1960s
- Dorothy Hatfield (1940–2024), aeronautical engineer
- Elaine Hatfield, American social psychologist
- Ernest I. Hatfield (1890–1977), New York politician
- Fred Hatfield, American baseball player
- Frederick Hatfield, powerlifter and PhD holder
- Henry D. Hatfield, politician from West Virginia
- Hurd Hatfield, American actor
- Jack Hatfield (1893–1965), English swimmer and water polo player
- James Hatfield (disambiguation), several people
- Jim Hatfield (1943–2025), American college basketball coach
- John Hatfield (disambiguation), several people
- Juliana Hatfield (born 1967), American musician and singer-songwriter
- Ken Hatfield, former American football player and coach
- Mark Hatfield, politician from Oregon
- Mark Hatfield (Georgia politician), State Representative (R) from Georgia's 177th District, first elected in 2005
- Percy Hatfield, Canadian politician
- Reo Hatfield, politician and businessman from Virginia
- Richard Hatfield, Canadian politician and lawyer from New Brunswick
- Rudy Hatfield, Filipino-American professional basketball player
- Sid Hatfield, Police Chief of Matewan, West Virginia during the Battle of Matewan
- Sidney Hatfield, American baseball player
- Tinker Hatfield, American shoe designer for Nike
- Thomas Hatfield, (?–1381) Bishop of Durham, England
- Wanda Hatfield, Cherokee politician
- Will Hatfield, British footballer
- William Hatfield (disambiguation), several people
- Robert Hatfield, (1942–1994) Navy Captain, Singer, and Song Writer from West Virginia

== Characters ==
- Rober Menzies "Bob" Hatfield, a fictional character on the Australian soap opera A Country Practice

== See also ==
- James Hetfield (born 1963), guitar player with Metallica
