= Hatfield =

Hatfield may refer to:

== Places ==
=== Settlements ===
==== Australia ====
- Hatfield, New South Wales, located in Balranald Shire

==== England ====
- Hatfield, East Riding of Yorkshire
- Hatfield, Herefordshire
- Hatfield, Hertfordshire
- Hatfield, South Yorkshire
- Hatfield, Worcestershire
- Hatfield Broad Oak, Essex
- Hatfield Forest, Essex

==== South Africa ====
- Hatfield, Pretoria

==== United States ====
- Hatfield, Arkansas
- Hatfield, California–Oregon
- Hatfield, Indiana
- Hatfield, Kentucky
- Hatfield, Massachusetts, a New England town
  - Hatfield (CDP), Massachusetts, the main village in the town
- Hatfield, Minnesota
- Hatfield, Missouri
- Hatfield, Pennsylvania
- Hatfield, Wisconsin
- Hatfield Township, Montgomery County, Pennsylvania

==== Zimbabwe ====
- Hatfield, Harare
  - Hatfield (constituency)

=== Structures ===
- Hatfield (Gautrain station), Pretoria, South Africa
- Hatfield Aerodrome, Hatfield, Hertfordshire, UK
- Hatfield College, Durham, University of Durham, UK
- Hatfield House (disambiguation), several places
- Hatfield Plantation, a historic plantation and mansion in Brenham, Texas, US
- Hatfield Polytechnic, now the University of Hertfordshire, UK
- HM Prison Hatfield, near Hatfield, South Yorkshire, UK

== Other uses ==
- Hatfield (surname)
- Hatfield Main F.C., an association football club in Doncaster, UK
- Hatfield Town F.C., an association football club in Hertfordshire, UK
- Hatfield Quality Meats, a manufacturer and supplier of fresh pork and prepared pork products based in Hatfield, Pennsylvania, US
- Mount Hatfield, a mountain in Canada
- USS Hatfield (DD-231), a U.S. Navy ship
- "Hatfield", a 2003 song by Byzantine from The Fundamental Component
