= Ferry Road drill hall, Dingwall =

Military building in Dingwall, Scotland

Ferry Road drill hall
- Dingwall, Scotland
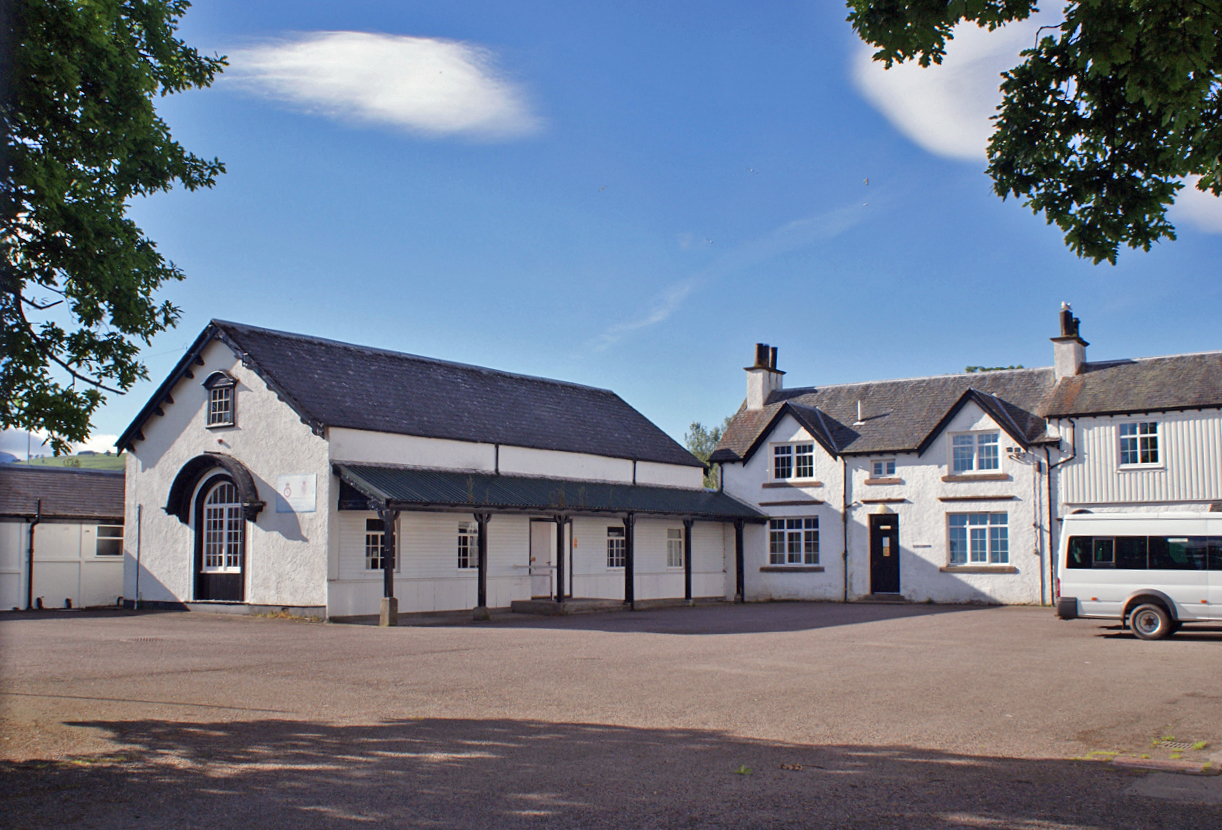
- Ferry Road drill hall, Dingwall

Site information
- Type: Drill hall

Location
- Location within Ross and Cromarty
- Coordinates: 57.59396°N 4.41629°W

Site history
- Built: c.1910
- Built for: War Office
- In use: c.1910 – Present

The Ferry Road drill hall, known locally as Seaforth Barracks, is a military installation in Dingwall, Scotland.

== History ==
The building was designed as the headquarters of the 4th (Ross Highland) Battalion, the Seaforth Highlanders in around 1910. The battalion was mobilised at the drill hall in August 1914 before being deployed to the Western Front. The battalion amalgamated with the 5th Battalion, the Seaforth Highlanders to form the 4th/5th Battalion, The Seaforth Highlanders (Ross-shire Buffs, The Duke of Albany's), with its headquarters at the Old Bank Road drill hall in Golspie, in 1921. The 4th Battalion and 5th Battalion operated separately from 1939 and 1941, when they amalgamated again after the surrender at Saint-Valery-en-Caux.

After the Second World War, the combined battalion amalgamated with 6th (Caithness and Sutherland) Battalion and 7th (Morayshire) Battalion to form 11th Battalion, The Seaforth Highlanders (Ross-shire Buffs, The Duke of Albany's), with its headquarters at the Ferry Road drill hall. The 11th Battalion then amalgamated with the 4th/5th Battalion, The Queen's Own Cameron Highlanders to form the home defence battalion of the Queen's Own Highlanders (Seaforth and Camerons) in 1967.

The home defence battalion of the Queen's Own Highlanders (Seaforth and Camerons) was in turn absorbed into the 51st Highland Volunteers in 1969, with a rifle platoon of C (Queen's Own Highlanders) Company, 2nd Battalion, 51st Highland Volunteers still based at the Ferry Road drill hall. Following a further re-organisation in 1995, the rifle platoon became part of Headquarters Company, 3rd (Volunteer) Battalion, The Highlanders (Seaforth, Gordons and Camerons) still based at the Ferry Road drill hall. However, following the Strategic Defence Review carried out in 1998, the rifle platoon was disbanded, and only an army cadet unit remains at the drill hall.
