= John Hatfield =

John Hatfield may refer to

- John Hatfield (forger) (1758?–1803), British forger
- John Hatfield (US Navy) (1795–1813), American midshipman
- John Hatfield (cricketer) (1831–1889), English cricketer
- John Hatfield (baseball) (1847–1909), American baseball player
- Jack Hatfield (1893–1965), British swimmer and water polo player
- John Hatfield (cyclist) (born 1940), Welsh cyclist
