= Argyll and Sutherland Highlanders =

Line infantry regiment of the British Army from 1881 to 2006

Argyll and Sutherland Highlanders (Princess Louise's)
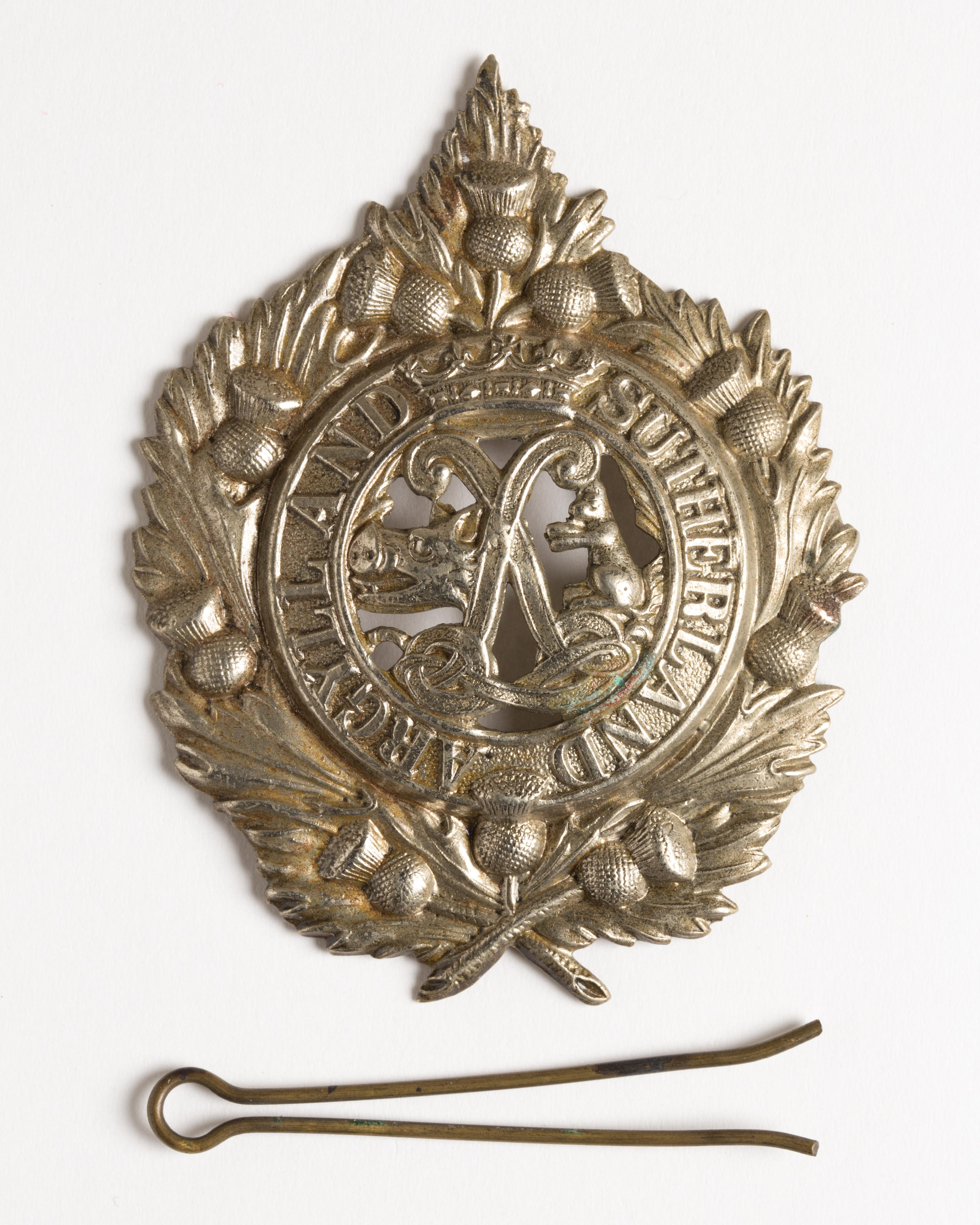
- Cap badge
- Active: 1881 – 2006
- Country: United Kingdom
- Branch: British Army
- Type: Line infantry
- Role: Light Infantry
- Size: Regiment with varying amount of battalions over time
- Garrison/HQ: RHQ – Stirling Castle
- Nickname: Thin Red Line
- Mottos: Ne Obliviscaris, Sans Peur
- March: Quick: Hielan' Laddie; Quick: The Campbells Are Coming; Charge: Monymusk; Funerals: Lochaber No More
- Mascot: A Shetland Pony named "Cruachan"
- Anniversaries: Balaklava (25 October 1854)

Commanders
- Ceremonial chief: King Charles III

Insignia
- Tactical Recognition Flash

The Argyll and Sutherland Highlanders (Princess Louise's) is a light infantry company (designated as Balaklava Company, 5th Battalion, Royal Regiment of Scotland) and was a line infantry regiment of the British Army that existed from 1881 until amalgamation into the Royal Regiment of Scotland on 28 March 2006.

The regiment was created under the Childers Reforms in 1881, as the Princess Louise's (Sutherland and Argyll Highlanders), by the amalgamation of the 91st (Argyllshire Highlanders) Regiment of Foot and 93rd (Sutherland Highlanders) Regiment of Foot, amended the following year to reverse the order of the "Argyll" and "Sutherland" sub-titles.

The Argyll and Sutherland Highlanders was expanded to fifteen battalions during the First World War (1914–1918) and nine during the Second World War (1939–1945). The 1st Battalion served in the 1st Commonwealth Division in the Korean War and gained a high public profile for its role in Aden during 1967.

As part of the restructuring of the British Army's infantry in 2006, the Argyll and Sutherland Highlanders were amalgamated with the Royal Scots, the King's Own Scottish Borderers, the Royal Highland Fusiliers (Princess Margaret's Own Glasgow and Ayrshire Regiment), the Black Watch (Royal Highland Regiment) and the Highlanders (Seaforth, Gordons and Camerons) into the seven-battalion Royal Regiment of Scotland. Following a further round of defence cuts announced in July 2012, the 5th Battalion was reduced to a single light infantry company called Balaklava Company, 5th Battalion, Royal Regiment of Scotland, (Argyll and Sutherland Highlanders).

== Early history ==
=== Formation ===
The regiment was formed in 1881 by the amalgamation of the 91st (Princess Louise's Argyllshire) Regiment and the 93rd (Sutherland Highlanders) Regiment as outlined in the Childers Reforms. It was one of the six Scottish line infantry regiments, and wore the Sutherland district tartan (Government No. 1A) as its regimental tartan; this is a lightened version of the Black Watch (Government No. 1) sett. The unit also had the largest cap badge in the British Army. The uniform included the Glengarry as its ceremonial headdress.

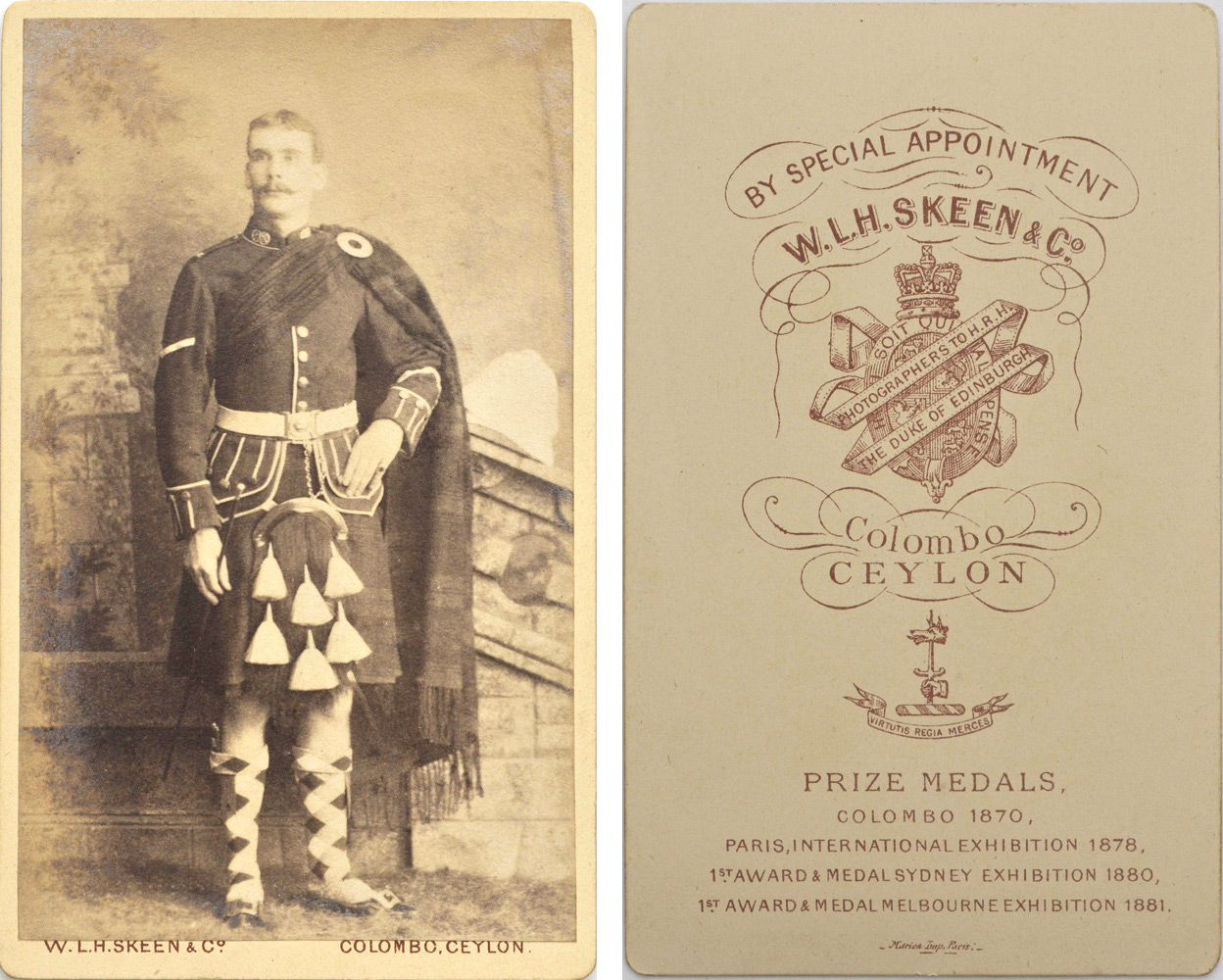
Unknown Lance Corporal of the Argyll and Sutherland Highlanders, Colombo, Ceylon

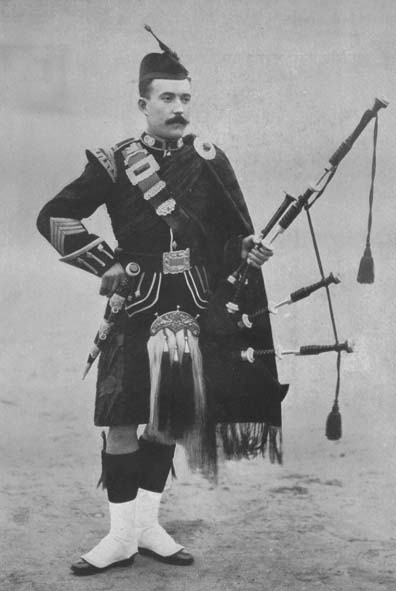
Argyll and Sutherland Highlanders Pipe Major

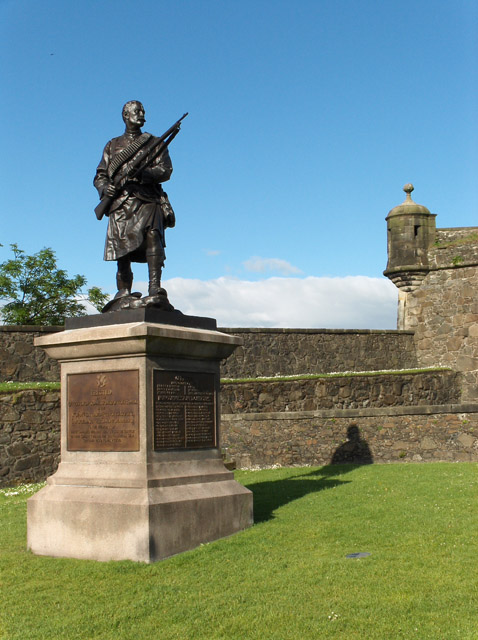
The Argyll and Sutherland Boer War Memorial at Stirling Castle.

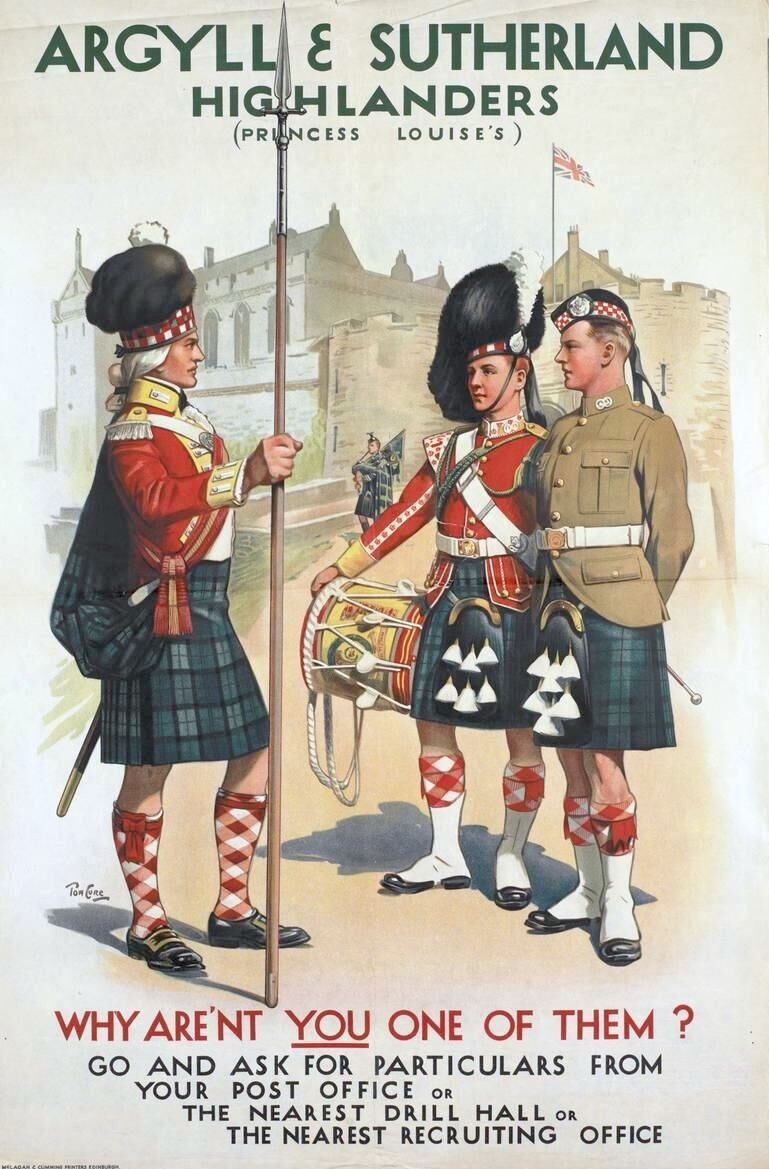
A 1914 recruiting poster for the Argyll & Sutherland Highlanders

At the Childers Reforms amalgamation, the Argyll and Sutherland Highlanders already had a well-earned reputation for valour in the face of the enemy, most notably the 93rd (later 2nd Battalion Argyll and Sutherland Highlanders) during the Crimean War. Here, the 93rd earned the sobriquet of "The Fighting Highlanders" and carried with it the status of having been the original "Thin Red Line". This title was bestowed following the action of the 93rd at Balaklava on 25 October 1854, in which this single battalion alone stood between the undefended British Army base at Balaklava and four squadrons of charging Russian cavalry. The 93rd, under the command of Sir Colin Campbell, not only held steady, but for the first time in the history of the British Army, broke a large cavalry charge using musket fire alone, without having been formed into a square.

This action was witnessed by the Times correspondent William Howard Russell, who reported that nothing stood between the Russian cavalry and the defenceless British base but the "thin red streak tipped with a line of steel of the 93rd": a description immediately paraphrased and passed into folklore as "The Thin Red Line". Later referred to by Kipling in his evocative poem "Tommy", the saying came to epitomise everything the British Army stood for. This feat of arms is still recognised by the plain red and white dicing worn on the cap band of the A and SH Glengarry bonnets.

=== Second Boer War ===
The 1st Battalion arrived in the Cape in November 1899 and formed part of the 3rd or Highland Brigade. The Argylls played leading roles in the Battle of Modder River, the Battle of Magersfontein, the Battle of Paardeberg, and in an action at Roodepoort immediately preceding the Battle of Doornkop. In June 1900, the battalion was transferred to a new brigade under Brigadier General George Cunningham. They operated around Pretoria and from April 1901, in the Eastern Transvaal. Sections of Argylls formed parts of the 2nd and 12th Battalions Mounted Infantry, and a detachment, along with the Black Watch, formed an escort for Captain J. E. Bearcroft's naval guns during the advance to Pretoria.

In 1908, the Volunteers and Militia were reorganised nationally, with the former becoming the Territorial Force and the latter the Special Reserve; the regiment now had two Reserve and five Territorial battalions. (Note: These were the 3rd Battalion and 4th Battalion (both Special Reserve), with the 5th (Renfrewshire) Battalion at Finnart Street in Greenock (since demolished), the 6th (Renfrewshire) Battalion at High Street in Paisley, the 7th Battalion at Princes Street in Stirling, the 8th (Argyllshire) Battalion at Queen Street in Dunoon (since demolished) and the 9th (Dunbartonshire) Battalion at Hartfield House in Dumbarton (all Territorial Force))

== First World War ==
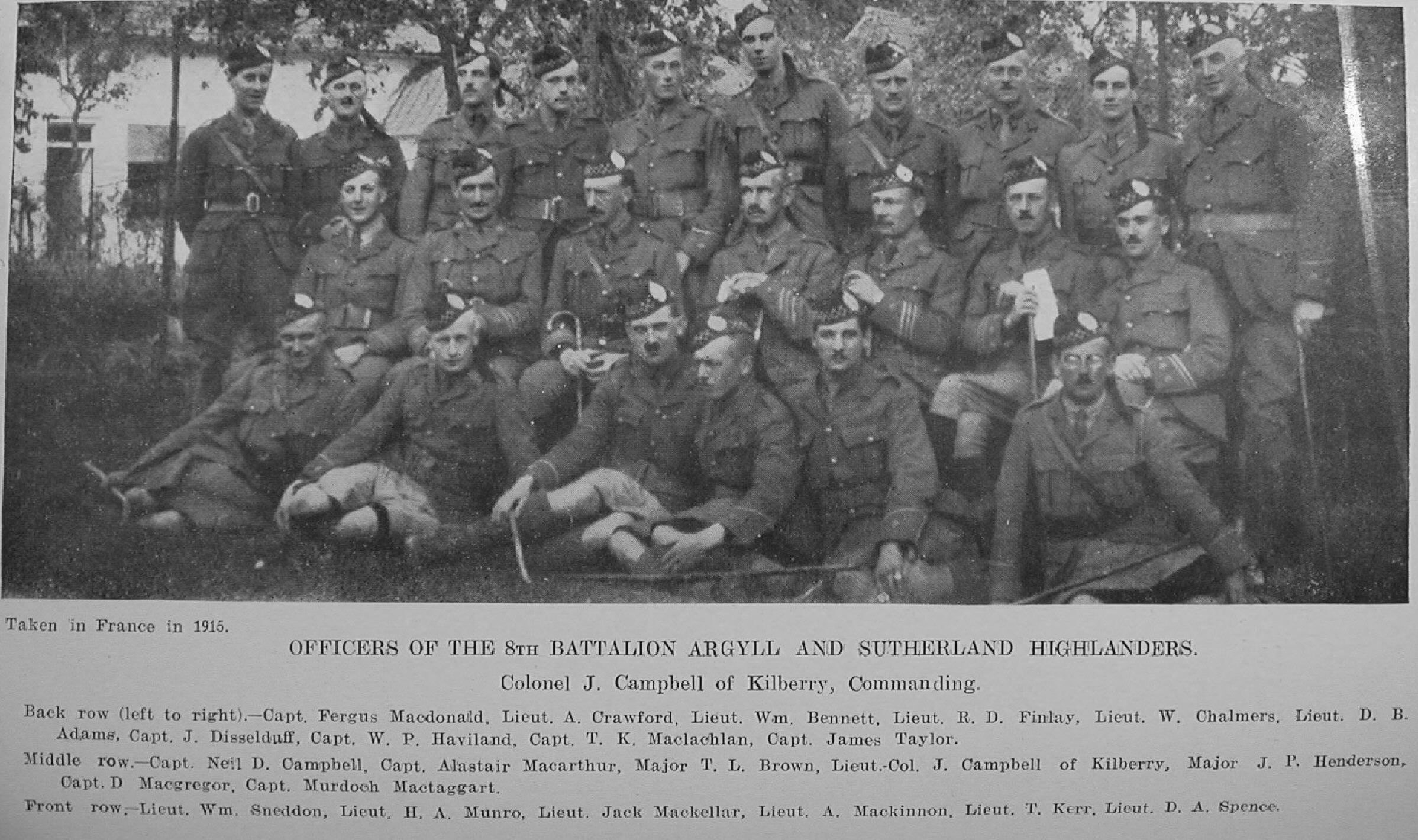
Officers of the 1/8th Battalion, Argyll and Sutherland Highlanders, 1915.

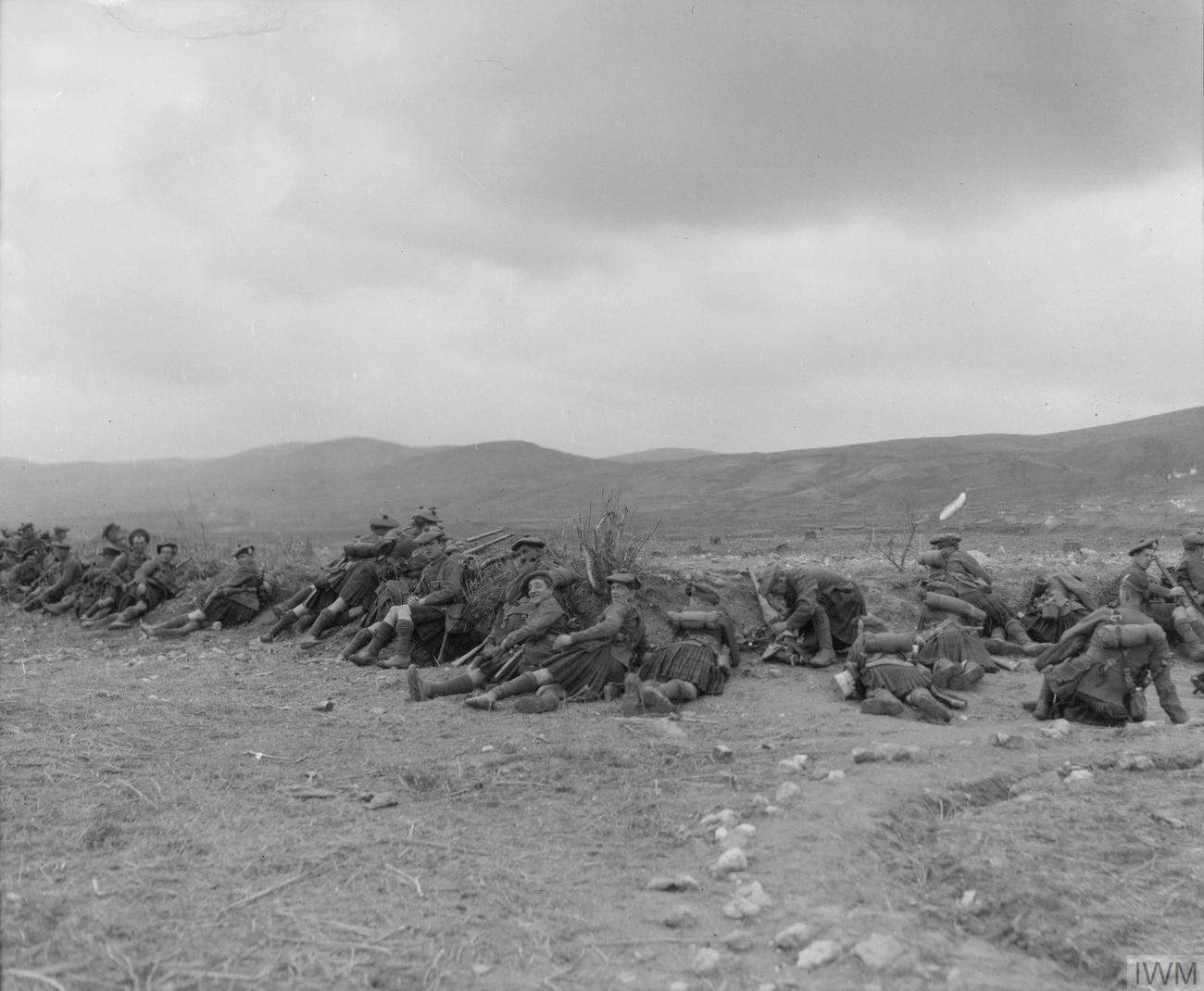
Tommies of the 12th (Service) Battalion, Argyll and Sutherland Highlanders resting under partial cover during a mock attack, whilst training near Salonika, 27 February 1916.

=== Regular Army ===
The 1st Battalion landed at Le Havre as part of the 81st Brigade in the 27th Division in December 1914 for service on the Western Front.

The 2nd Battalion landed at Boulogne-sur-Mer as part of the 19th Brigade, which was operating independently, in August 1914 for service on the Western Front.

=== Territorial Force ===
The 1/5th (Renfrewshire) Battalion landed at Cape Helles as part of the 157th Brigade in the 52nd (Lowland) Division in June 1915; the battalion was evacuated to Egypt in January 1916 and then landed at Marseille in April 1918 for service on the Western Front.

The 1/6th (Renfrewshire) Battalion landed in France as part of the 152nd Brigade in the 51st (Highland) Division in May 1915; the battalion moved to Italy in November 1917 but returned to France in April 1918.

The 1/7th Battalion landed in France as part of the 10th Brigade in the 4th Division in December 1914 for service on the Western Front.

The 1/8th (The Argyllshire) Battalion landed in France as part of the 152nd Brigade in the 51st (Highland) Division in May 1915 for service on the Western Front.

The 1/9th (The Dumbartonshire) Battalion landed in France as part of the 81st Brigade in the 27th Division in February 1915 for service on the Western Front.

=== New Armies ===
The 10th (Service) Battalion landed at Boulogne-sur Mer as part of the 27th Brigade in the 9th (Scottish) Division in May 1915 for service on the Western Front.

The 11th (Service) Battalion landed at Boulogne-sur-Mer as part of the 45th Brigade in the 15th (Scottish) Division in July 1915 for service on the Western Front.

The 12th (Service) Battalion landed at Boulogne-sur-Mer as part of the 77th Brigade in the 26th Division in September 1915 but moved to Salonika in November 1915.

The 14th (Service) Battalion landed at Le Havre as part of the 120th Brigade in the 40th Division in June 1916 for service on the Western Front.

== Interwar ==
=== Irish War of Independence ===
During the Irish War of Independence, the 2nd Battalion of the Argyll and Sutherland Highlanders was sent to be stationed in Claremorris, County Mayo in 1919.

Though the battalion's time in Ireland was mostly uneventful, soldiers from the regiment were involved in the death of Captain Patrick "Paddy" Boland, the officer commanding of the Crossard Company, East Mayo Brigade of the Irish Republican Army (IRA). On 27 May 1921, the Argyll and Sutherland Highlanders shot and killed Boland while he was allegedly attempting to escape near his home in Aghamore; Boland's body was reportedly severely mutilated after his death.

=== Interwar years ===
By 1931, the 2nd Battalion of the Argyll and Sutherland Highlanders was stationed in Hong Kong and was initially involved in quelling anti-Japanese riots.

In 1932, the Argyll and Sutherland Highlanders was deployed to Shanghai, specifically as part of the Shanghai Volunteer Corps. They were involved in the defense of the International Settlement during the January 28 Incident, a conflict between China and Japan. The Regiment was stationed in the British sector and helped defend the northern boundary of the International Settlement.

The Regiment was transferred to Waziristan, then known as India's North West Frontier, from 1935 to 1938 as part of efforts to maintain control in the region. This deployment was part of a larger British military presence aimed at quelling tribal unrest and maintaining security in the area, which was known for its mountainous terrain and challenging conditions. The regiment was particularly stationed at the Gharion Camp with the Bannu Brigade, fighting in the Shan Plain against the Fakir of Ipi.

== Second World War ==
=== 1st Battallion ===
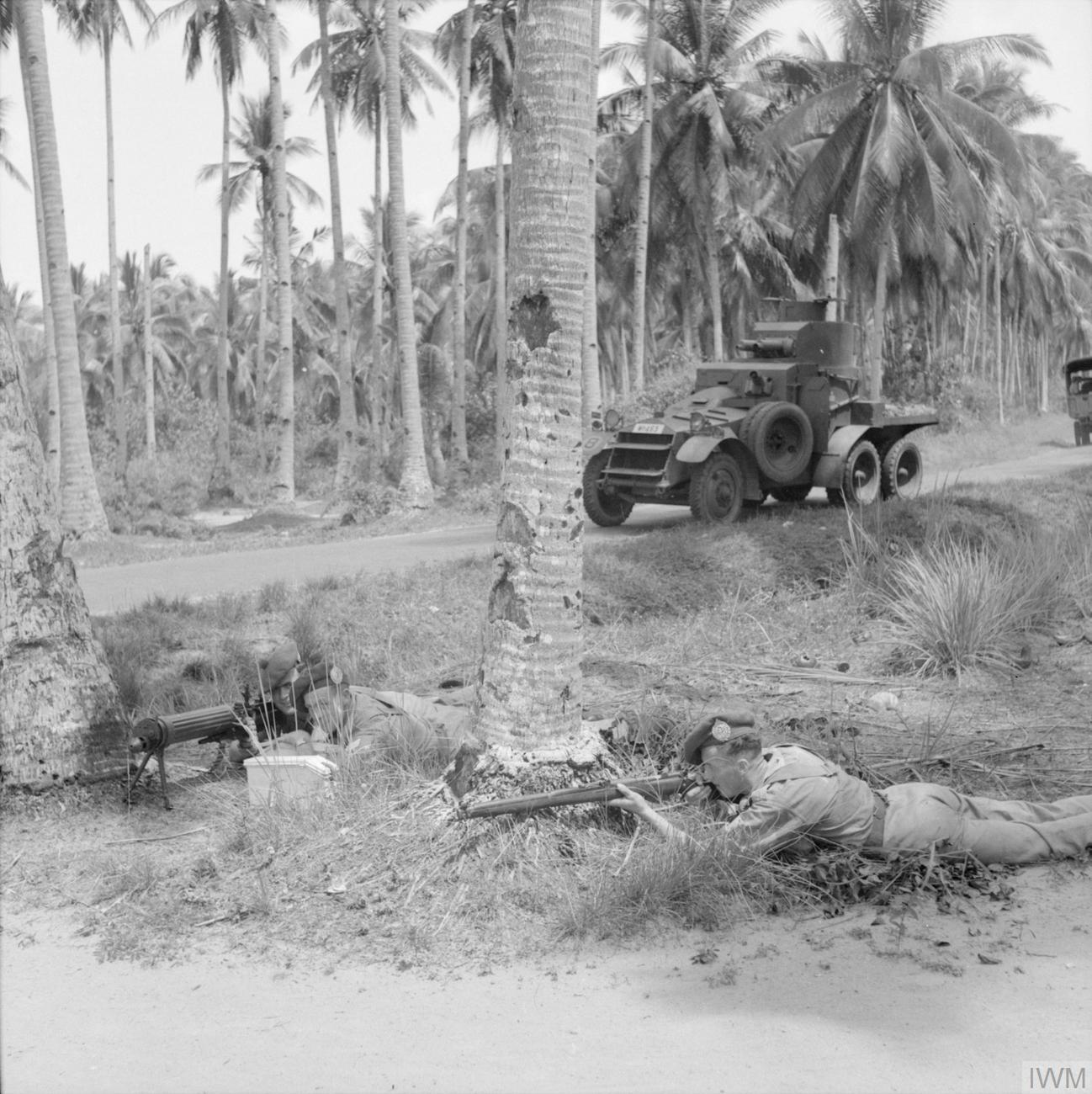
Men of the 2nd Argyll and Sutherland Highlanders training with a Lanchester six-wheeled armoured car in the Malayan jungle on 13 November 1941.

The 1st Battalion fought in the Western Desert Campaign, Crete, Abyssinia, Sicily and in the Italian Campaign. The first action for the 1st Battalion was at Sidi Barani, where they joined the battle on 10 December 1940 as part of the 16th Infantry Brigade. On 17 May 1941, the battalion moved to Crete where they formed part of the defence based on the east side of the island at Tymbaki. Most of the Argylls marched from Tymbaki to the airfield at Heraklion on the night of 24 May to help support the 14th Infantry Brigade in the fighting at that airfield. They were successfully evacuated on 29 May from Heraklion, but their convoy suffered air attacks and many casualties on the route away from Crete. The Argylls left at Tymbaki were captured when the island surrendered.

The 1st Battalion was shipped to Alexandria and, after garrison duties followed by a raid into the Gondar region of Abyssinia, they were sent back to the Western Desert. There, they were eventually attached to the 161st Indian Infantry Brigade, part of 4th Indian Infantry Division, and fought in the Second Battle of El Alamein. In 1943, the 1st Battalion landed on Sicily during Operation Husky, the Allied invasion of Sicily, attached to the 5th British Infantry Division as the 33rd Beach Brick. From February 1944, the battalion fought through the Italian Campaign with the 19th Indian Infantry Brigade, attached to 8th Indian Infantry Division.

=== 2nd Battallion ===
The 2nd Battalion fought against the Imperial Japanese Army during the fighting in Malaya and Singapore (see Battle of Bukit Timah). Led by Lieutenant Colonel Ian Stewart, they were one of the very few British units that was prepared for the jungle warfare in Malaya. In the months before the invasion of southern Thailand and Malaya in 1941, Stewart took his battalion into the harshest terrain he could find and developed tactics to fight effectively in those areas. This training that the 2nd Argylls went through would make them arguably the most effective unit in General Arthur Percival's Malayan Command, earning them the nickname "the jungle beasts".

During the withdrawal of the 11th Indian Infantry Division, the 2nd Argylls slowed the enemy advance and inflicted heavy casualties. During these actions, the battalion became so depleted by battle that it was ordered back into Singapore. Two days later, 2,000 or so men of the 22nd Australian Brigade (the absolute tail guard of the British forces) arrived at the causeway. An Australian staff officer was amazed to find the Argylls camped on the Malay side of the water, and asked why they were in Malaya when they could have been in the relative comfort of Singapore. Lt. Col. Stewart replied: "You know the trouble with you Australians is that you have no sense of history. When the story of this campaign is written you will find that the ASHR goes down as the last unit to cross this causeway what's more – piped across by their pipers".

The Argylls had lost 800 men due to continuous action as rear guards (especially at the Battle of Slim River). When the remaining Argylls arrived in Singapore in December 1941, the battalion was reinforced with some Royal Marines who had survived the sinking of HMS Prince of Wales and HMS Repulse. The merger was held at Tyersall Park, and the battalion was informally renamed "Plymouth Argylls": this was in reference to the Argylls' affiliation with Plymouth Argyle F.C. and to the Plymouth Division of the Royal Marines, which all the Marines were from.

The battalion surrendered with the rest of the army in Singapore in February 1942. Many Argylls died in captivity as prisoners of war (POWs) or in the jungle trying to avoid capture. A few Argylls managed to escape to India, including Lt. Col. Stewart, where they lectured on jungle warfare tactics. After this, the evacuees became part of No. 6 GHQ Training Team, which organised training exercises and lectures for the 14th Indian Infantry Division and 2nd British Infantry Division.

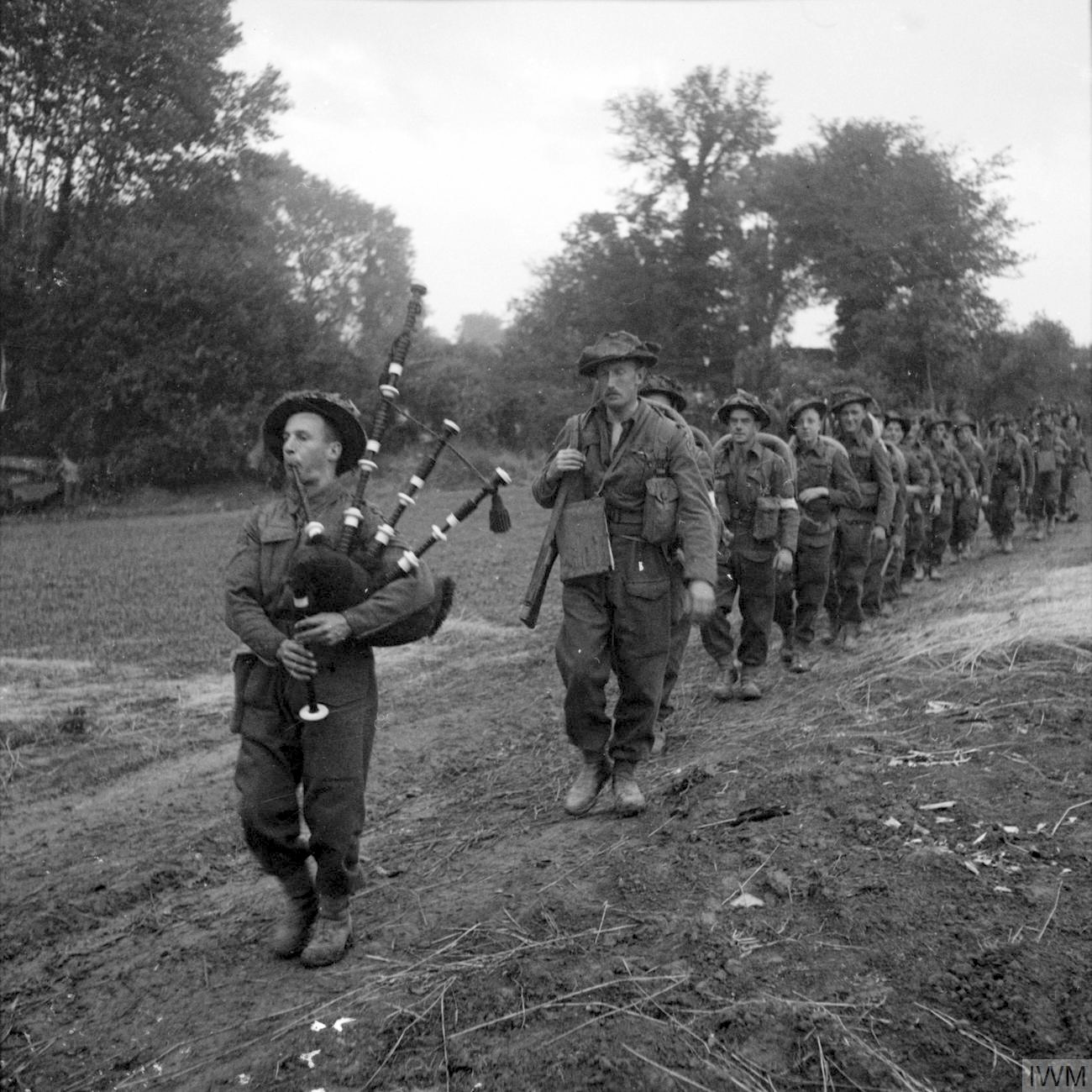
The 2nd Battalion, led by their piper, advance during Operation Epsom in Normandy in June 1944.

In May 1942, the 15th Battalion, raised during the war, was redesignated as the new 2nd Battalion. This battalion joined the 227th (Highland) Infantry Brigade and became a part of the 15th (Scottish) Infantry Division, a formation that would gain an excellent reputation, in 1943. With the division, the battalion fought in the Battle for Caen, seeing its first action in Operation Epsom, as part of Operation Overlord. The division ended the war on the Elbe River.

=== Other battalions ===
The 5th battalion landed in France as part of the British Expeditionary Force in September 1939. They took part in the Dunkirk evacuation in June 1940 and then, after converting to become the 91st Anti-Tank Regiment and seeing action at the Normandy landings in June 1944, they fought through North-West Europe to the River Elbe.

The 6th Battalion landed in France as corps troops for I Corps with the British Expeditionary Force in September 1939. They also took part in the Dunkirk evacuation in June 1940 and then, after converting to become the 93rd Anti-Tank Regiment, Royal Artillery, saw action in the Tunisia campaign, in the Allied landings in Sicily and in the Allied landings in Italy.

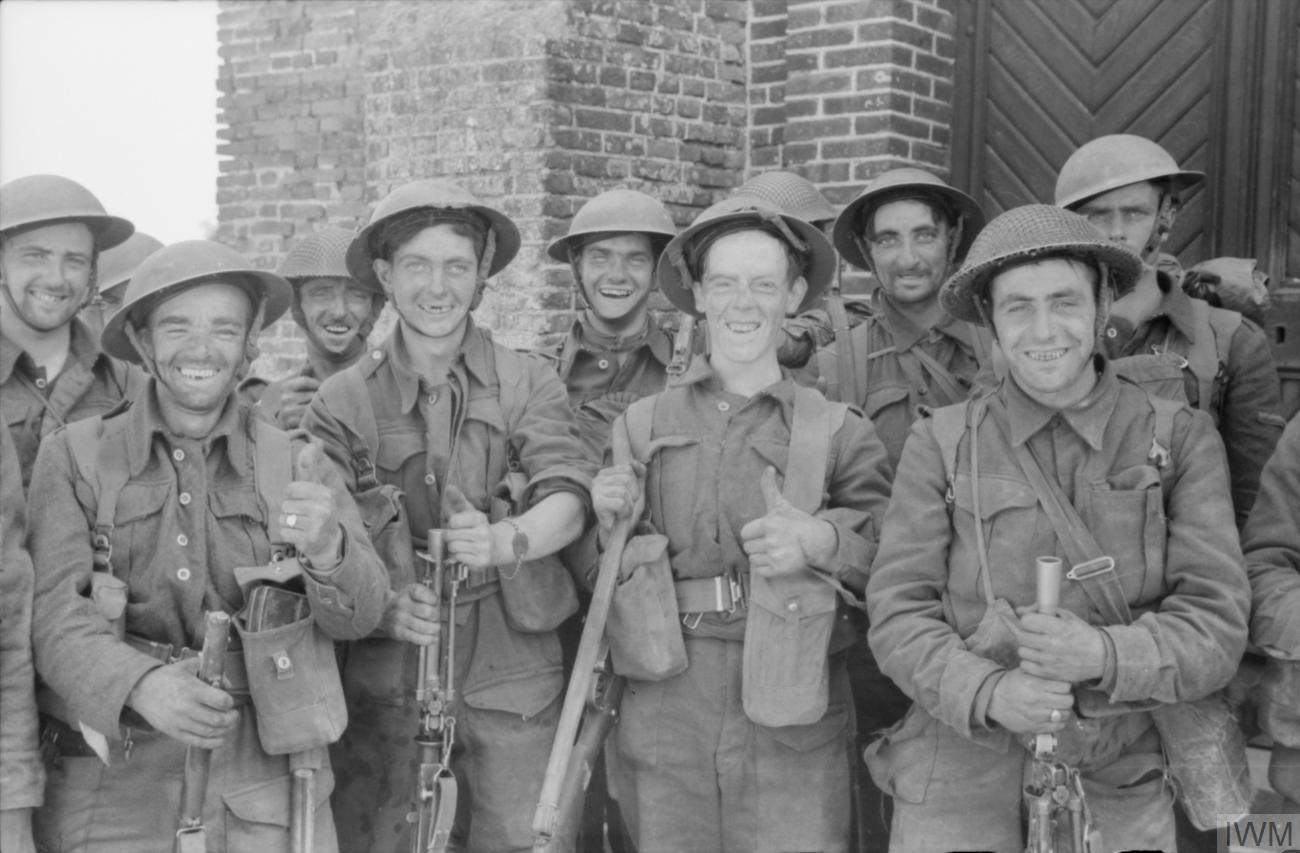
Men of the 7th Battalion, Argyll and Sutherland Highlanders, Millbosche, France, 7 June 1940.

The 7th Battalion was a Territorial Army (TA) unit serving in the 154th (Highland) Infantry Brigade. The brigade was part of the 51st (Highland) Infantry Division in France in 1940 as part of the British Expeditionary Force (BEF). They were stationed on the Maginot Line, so they avoided being encircled with the rest of the BEF during the Battle of France. The 7th Argylls in particular suffered heavy losses during the fighting, the worst day in its history. The 154th Brigade managed to be evacuated to England after the 51st (Highland) Division was forced to surrender on 12 June 1940.

The division was reconstituted by the redesignation of the 9th (Highland) Infantry Division to the 51st. The understrength 154th Brigade of the old 51st was merged with the 28th Infantry Brigade. In 1942, the new 51st Division, 7th Argylls included, were sent to join the British Eighth Army in the North African Campaign. They fought in the First Battle of El Alamein and in the Second Battle of El Alamein, which turned the tide of the war in favour of the Allies. During the fighting in North Africa, Lieutenant Colonel Lorne MacLaine Campbell of 7th Argylls was awarded the Victoria Cross.

In March 1942, two British privates from the 7th battalion, Macfarlane and Goldie, escaped wearing their blue work detail overalls over their battledress. They wore rucksacks to cover the markings "KG" (Kriegsgefangener, "prisoner of war") on their backs. They secreted themselves in a rail wagon carrying salt to Belgium. There they managed to contact an escape line and, by the middle of the year, they were safely back in Scotland.

The 8th Battalion was also a Territorial Army (TA) unit serving with the 7th Battalion in the 154th (Highland) Infantry Brigade. The brigade was part of the 51st (Highland) Infantry Division in France in 1940 as part of the British Expeditionary Force. The 154th Brigade managed to be evacuated to England after the 51st (Highland) Division was forced to surrender on 12 June 1940. On 25 April 1943, the 8th Battalion was, by this time, serving with the 36th Brigade, part of the 78th Battleaxe Division during the Tunisian Campaign won fame during the assault of Djebel Ahmera hill on the attack on Longstop Hill, in which despite heavy casualties from mortar and machine gun fire scaled and took the heights. Major John Thompson McKellar Anderson, for inspiring his men and eliminating strong points, gained the Victoria Cross.

The 9th Battalion, also a Territorial unit, was converted to artillery as the 54th Light Anti-Aircraft Regiment, Royal Artillery comprising three batteries from the former Companies: 160 (Dumbarton), 161 (Alexandria) and 162 (Helensburgh). Former B Company (Kirkintilloch) and D Company (Clydebank) formed the nucleus of the second-line regiment, the 58th LAA, comprising 172,173 and 174 Batteries. Armed with Bofors and Lewis guns, the 54th saw action protecting the rear of the retreat of the BEF to Dunkirk, destroying the Bofors before rescue. 162 Battery became detached protecting airfields at Reims and escaped in June via Brest, St. Nazaire and La Rochelle.

Between Dunkirk and D-Day, they were deployed mostly in training and protecting airfields and other sites in England, including Manchester, as part of 44th AA Brigade. They participated in Operation Harlequin on the south coast and were then transferred to 9th Armoured Division until its dispersal in 1944, and then to the 21st Army Group. They were deployed after D-Day, in August 1944, in support of the First Canadian Army, landing at Juno Beach. They provided support at Rouen and Pont-de-l'Arche and onward through northern France to Boulogne and subsequently, Antwerp and Ostend in Belgium. In November, they moved onward to Kloosterzande, Holland, remaining there until the end of the war. They continued into Germany as part of the British Army of the Rhine (BAOR), helping guard POWs at Munsterlager until November 1945. Then, they moved on to Brunswick until early 1946, when the regiment was put into "suspended animation" and demobilised. The 58th joined the BEF and participated in the defence of Boulogne and Calais. From May 1941, they served as part of 11th Armoured Division, initially as part of 11th Support Group until it was disbanded 1 June 1942, then transferring to Divisional Troops. In 1944, they were deployed in Operation Overlord and later that year, south and east of Eindhoven, Holland.

== Post-Second World War ==
Between 1945 and 1948, the 1st Battalion saw service in Mandatory Palestine, during the conflicts with the Jewish paramilitary organisations Irgun, Haganah and Lehi.

In 1948, the 2nd Battalion was amalgamated with the 1st Battalion. The battalion was one of the first British units to serve in the Korean War, arriving there in September 1950 as part of the 27th British Commonwealth Brigade. In its first major action, in the battle of Naktong, the battalion was involved in a tragic friendly-fire incident in the fight for Hill 282. The Argylls were noted for their reoccupation of the Crater district of Aden, under controversial Commanding officer Lieutenant Colonel Colin Campbell Mitchell, during the Aden Emergency in the mid-1960s.

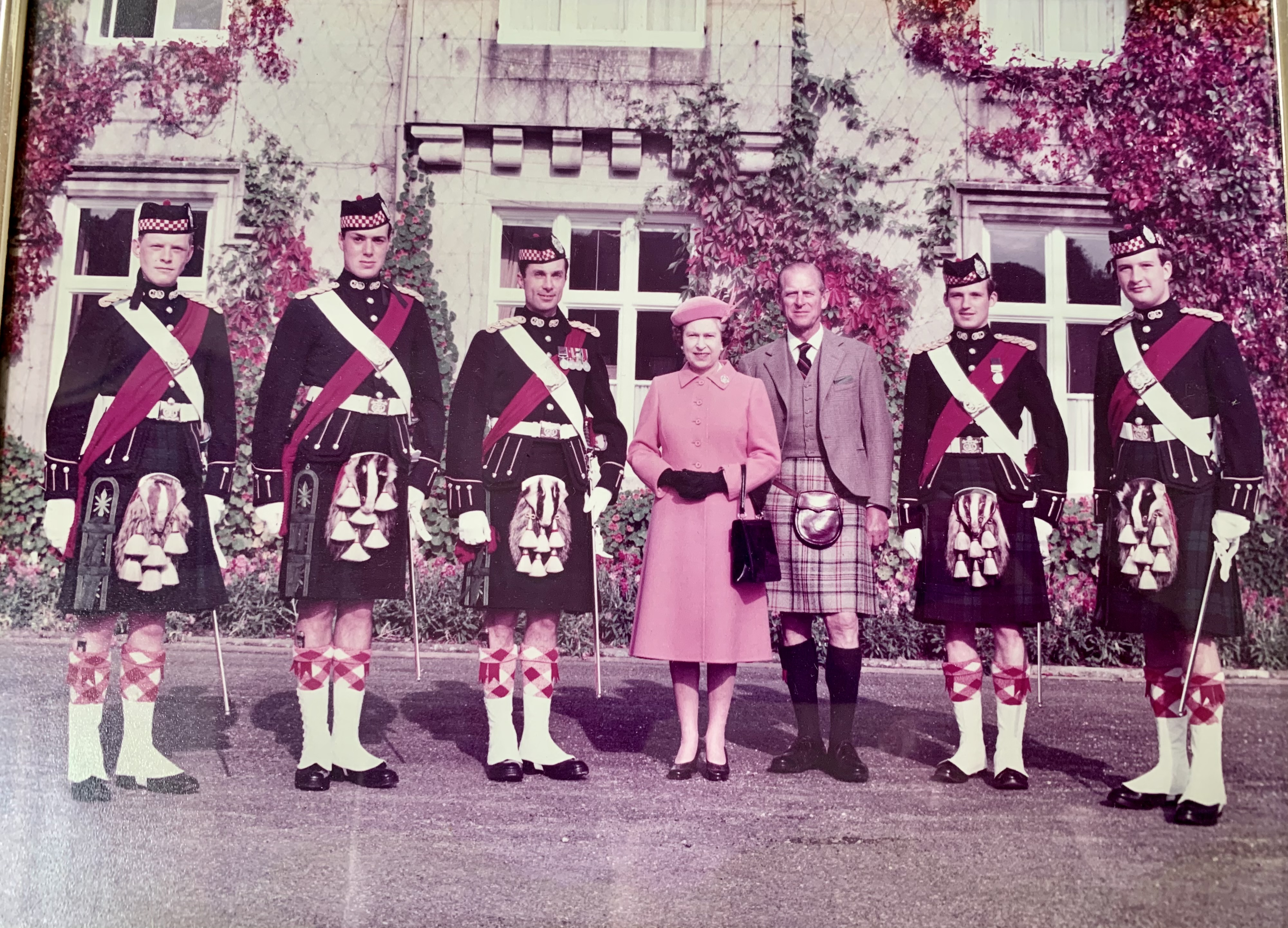
Officers of the Argylls with their Colonel-In-Chief, HM Queen Elizabeth II, and Prince Philip at Balmoral Castle in 1985.

In 1970, the Argyll and Sutherland Highlanders, as the junior regiment of the Scottish Division, faced disbandment as part of a general downsizing of the army. A "Save the Argylls" campaign involving the petitioning of Parliament resulted in a compromise under which a single regular company retained the title and colours of the regiment. "Balaclava Company" continued as an independent unit from 20 January 1971 until the regiment was restored to full battalion size on 17 January 1972. Between 1972 and 2003 the regiment regularly served in Northern Ireland during The Troubles.

In January 2004, the regiment was deployed to the Iraq War. During this deployment, the regiment was involved in numerous actions, including at the notorious Battle of Danny Boy. On return to the UK in late 2004, the regiment was presented with the Wilkinson Sword of Peace by Queen Elizabeth II, the Colonel-in-Chief, for its contribution to peace in Belfast in the aftermath of the Holy Cross dispute. She also presented Iraq Medals to selected soldiers.

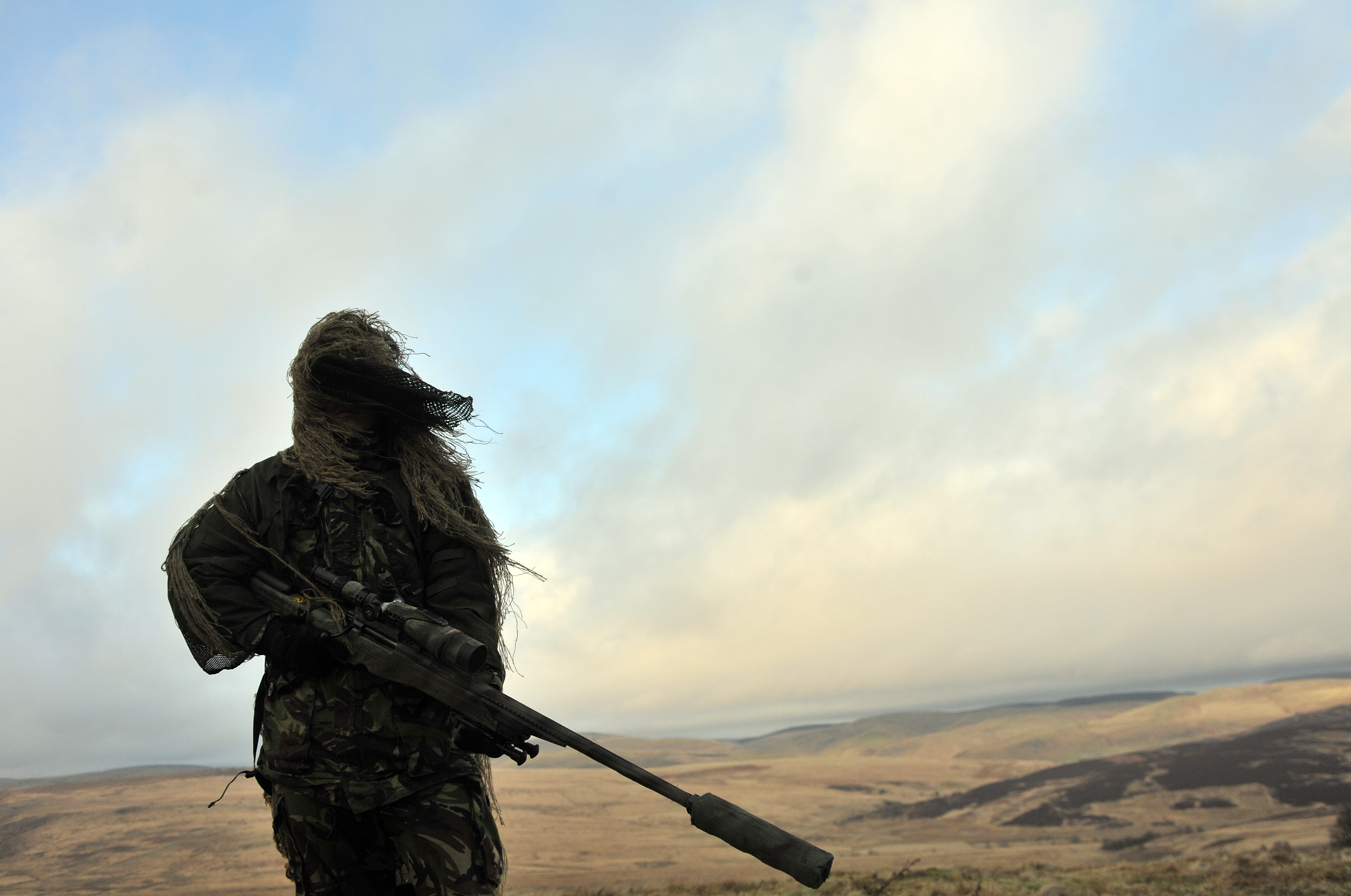
A sniper of 5 SCOTS (The Argyll and Sutherland Highlanders) during Exercise Boar's Head at Otterburn Training Area in February 2012.

On 28 March 2006, as part of the restructuring of the infantry, the Argyll and Sutherland Highlanders were amalgamated with the other Scottish infantry regiments into the single Royal Regiment of Scotland. The regiment's last role before amalgamation was in the air assault role as part of 16 Air Assault Brigade. Elements of the new regiment originally affiliated with the Argyll and Sutherland Highlanders included a regular battalion (5 SCOTS), an affiliated company of the Territorial Army battalion, 51st Highland Volunteers (7 SCOTS) and an Army Cadet Force battalion. The 5th Battalion continued recruiting in the area allocated to the Argylls, wore a green hackle on its headdress to differentiate it from the other battalions, and were permitted to use the title "The Argyll and Sutherland Highlanders" in parenthesis in reference to the battalion.

On 5 July 2012, a further series of measures to reduce the total size of the British Army were announced by Defence Secretary Philip Hammond. These included the reduction of The Argyll and Sutherland Highlanders (5 SCOTS) to a single company (Balaklava Company) for public (ceremonial) duties in Scotland. The Queen visited the Highlanders at Howe Barracks in Canterbury in June 2013 to mark their relocation to Scotland.

When the company is mounting royal guard/guard duties they are divided into two platoons; Pony Platoon (ceremonial) and Security Platoon. When not mounting guard, the company is divided into No. 1 and No. 2 platoons for regular deployment. Following the Army 2020 Refine, the company moved to Redford Barracks where they remain as part of the 51st Infantry Brigade and Headquarters Scotland.

== Regimental museum ==
The Argyll and Sutherland Highlanders Regimental Museum is the regimental museum of the Argyll and Sutherland Highlanders, their antecedent regiments, and successor battalions. Located in Stirling Castle, the museum building was built in the 1490s, and known as the "King's House" or "King's Old Building", thought to have been the private residence of King James IV. Entrance to the museum is included in the price of the castle entrance ticket. The museum is almost entirely maintained through public donations; the modest grant from the Ministry of Defence has been withdrawn. It is governed by a charitable trust: The Argyll and Sutherland Highlanders Museum Trust.

The museum closed for refurbishment in August 2018. It re-opened again, following completion of a programme of works funded by the National Lottery Heritage Fund and costing £4 million, in June 2021.

== Battle honours ==
The regiment's battle honours include:

- Cape of Good Hope 1806 –
  - Rolica, Vimeira, Corunna, Pyrenees, Nivelle, Nive, Orthes, Toulouse, Peninsula, South Africa 1846–47, 1851–52–53, Alma, Balaklava, Sevastopol, Lucknow, South Africa 1879, Modder River, Paardeberg, South Africa 1899–1902.
- First World War –
  - Mons, Le Cateau, Retreat from Mons, Marne 1914, 18, Aisne 1914, La Bassée 1914, Messines 1914, 18, Armentières 1914, Ypres 1915, 17, 18, Gravenstafel, St Julien, Frezenberg, Bellewaarde, Festubert 1915, Loos, Somme 1916, 18, Albert 1916, 18, Bazentin, Delville Wood, Pozières, Flers-Courcelette, Morval, Le Transloy, Ancre Heights, Ancre 1916, Arras 1917,18, Scarpe 1917, 18, Arleux, Pilckem, Menin Road, Polygon Wood, Broodseinde, Poelcappelle, Passchendaele, Cambrai 1917,18, St Quentin, Bapaume 1918, Rosières, Lys, Estaires, Hazebrouck, Bailleul, Kemmel, Bethune, Soissonnais-Ourcq, Tardenois, Amiens, Hindenburg Line, Epehy, Canal du Nord, St Quentin Canal, Beaurevoir, Kortrijk, Selle, Sambre, France and Flanders 1914–18, Italy 1917–18, Struma, Doiran 1917, 18, Macedonia 1915–18, Gallipoli 1915–16, Rumani, Egypt 1916, Gaza, El Mughar, Nebi Samwil, Jaffa, Palestine 1917–18.
- Second World War –
  - Somme 1940, Odon, Tourmauville Bridge, Caen, Esquay, Mont Pincon, Quarry Hill, Estry, Falaise, Dives Crossing, Aart, Lower Maas, Meijel, Venlo Pocket, Ourthe, Rhineland, Reichswald, Rhine, Uelzen, Artlenburg, North-West Europe 1940, 44–45, Abyssinia 1941, Sidi Barrani, El Alamein, Medenine, Akarit, Diebel Azzag 1942, Kef Ouiba Pass, Mine de Sedjenane, Medjez Plain, Longstop Hill 1943, North Africa 1940–43, Landing in Sicily, Gerbini, Adrano, Centuripe, Sicily 1943, Termoli, Sangro, Cassino II, Liri Valley, Aquino, Monte Casalino, Monte Spaduro, Monte Grande, Senio, Santerno Crossing, Argenta Gap, Italy 1943–45, Crete, Heraklion, Middle East 1941, North Malaya, Grik Road, Central Malaya, Ipoh, Slim River, Singapore Island, Malaya 1941–42.
- Korean War – Pakchon, Korea 1950–51.

== Victoria Cross recipients ==
- Lance Corporal J. Dunlay, 16 November 1857, Indian Mutiny
- Captain W. G. D. Stewart, 16 November 1857, Indian Mutiny
- Private P. Grant, 16 November 1857, Indian Mutiny
- Private (later Sergeant) D. MacKay, 16 November 1857, Indian Mutiny
- Colour-Sergeant J. Munro, 16 November 1857, Indian Mutiny
- Sergeant J. Paton, 16 November 1857, Indian Mutiny
- Lieutenant (later Major-General) W. McBean, 11 March 1858, Indian Mutiny
- Capt J. A. Liddell 31 July 1915 Belgium
- Lieut J. R. N. Graham 22 April 1917 Mesopotamia
- 2nd Lieut A. Henderson MC 23 April 1917 France
- 2nd Lieut J. C. Buchan 21 March 1918 France
- Lieut D. L. MacIntyre 24–27 Aug 1918 France
- Lieut W. D. Bissett 25 October 1918 France
- Lieut Col L. M. Campbell, DSO, TD 6 April 1943 Wadi Akarit
- Major J. T. McKellar Anderson, DSO, TD 23 April 1943 Longstop Hill
- Major K. Muir 23 September 1950 Korea

== Colonels-in-chief ==
Colonels-in-chief of the regiment were:

- 1914–1939: HRH The Duchess of Argyll VA CI GCVO GBE GCStJ RRC
- 1947–2006: HM The Queen

== Regimental colonels ==
Colonels of the regiment were:

- 1881–1888 (1st Battalion) Gen. James Robertson Craufurd (ex 91st Foot)
- 1881–1888: (2nd Battalion) Gen. Hon. Sir Robert Rollo, KCB (ex 93rd Foot)
- 1888–1895: Gen. George Erskine
- 1895–1904: Gen. Sir John Alexander Ewart, KCB
- 1904–1905: Lt-Gen. Sir Frederick William Traill Burroughs, KCB
- 1905–1907: Lt-Gen. John Sprot
- 1907–1915: Maj-Gen. John Edward Boyes, CB
- 1915–1937: Maj-Gen. Sir Alexander Wilson, KCB
- 1937–1945: Maj-Gen. Gervase Thorpe, CB, CMG, DSO
- 1945–1958: Gen. Sir Gordon Holmes Alexander MacMillan of MacMillan, KCB, KCVO, CBE, DSO, MC
- 1958–1972: Maj-Gen. Frederick Clarence Campbell Graham, CB, DSO, DL
- 1972–1982: Lt-Gen. Sir Alexander Crawford Simpson Boswell, KCB, CBE
- 1982–1992: Gen. Sir Charles Patrick Ralph Palmer, KBE
- 1992–2000: Maj-Gen. David Phillips Thomson, CB, CBE, MC
- 2000–2006: Lt-Gen. Sir Andrew John Noble Graham, Bt, CB, CBE (to Royal Regiment of Scotland)
- 2006: Regiment amalgamated with The Royal Scots, The Royal Highland Fusiliers, The King's Own Scottish Borderers, The Black Watch and The Highlanders (Seaforth, Gordons and Camerons) to form The Royal Regiment of Scotland

== Affiliations ==
Units that have formed affiliations with the regiment include:

- Canada – The Argyll and Sutherland Highlanders of Canada (Princess Louise's)
- Canada – The Calgary Highlanders (10th Canadians)
- Canada – Cape Breton Highlanders
- Australia – The Royal Queensland Regiment
- Australia – The Royal New South Wales Regiment
- Pakistan – 1st Battalion (Scinde), The Frontier Force Regiment
- Royal Navy – HMS Argyll
- United Kingdom – Argyll and Sutherland Highlanders Battalion ACF, Balaklava Company, West Lowland Battalion ACF

== See also ==
- Notable members of the Argyll and Sutherland Highlanders
- Armed forces in Scotland
- Military history of Scotland

== Sources ==
- Barker, F. R. P. (1950). History of the 9th Argyll & Sutherland Highlanders 54th Light A.A. Regiment 1939–45. Thomas Nelson and Sons. OCLC 493113190.
- Frederick, J. B. M. (1984). Lineage Book of British Land Forces 1660–1978, Volume I. Wakefield, United Kingdom: Microform Academic Publishers. ISBN 1851170073.
- Graham, Frederick Clarence Campbell (1948). History of the Argyll & Sutherland Highlanders, 1st Battalion (Princess Louise's) 1939–1945. T. Nelson and sons.
- Jeffreys, Alan (2003). British Infantrymen in the Far East 1941–1945. Osprey Publishing. ISBN 1841764485.
- Levine, Alan (2007). D-Day to Berlin: The Northwest Europe Campaign, 1944–45. Stackpole. ISBN 9780811733861.
- Royle, Trevor (2011). The Argyll and Sutherland Highlanders: A Concise History. Random House. ISBN 9781780572444.
- Thompson, P. (2005). The Battle for Singapore; The True Story of the Greatest Catastrophe of World War Two. Piatkus Books. ISBN 9780749950996.
