= Cooper Park drill hall, Elgin =

Former military installation in Scotland

Cooper Park drill hall
- Elgin, Scotland
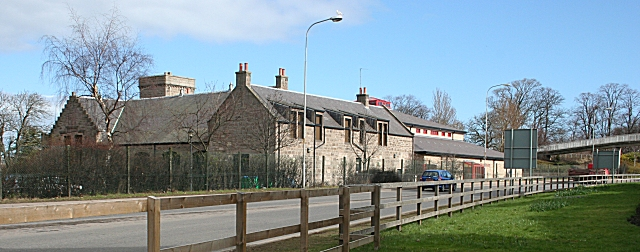
- Cooper Park drill hall, now part of Elgin Library

Site information
- Type: Drill hall

Location
- Location within Moray
- Coordinates: 57.65054°N 3.31274°W

Site history
- Built: 1908
- Built for: War Office
- In use: 1908 – c.2006

The Cooper Park drill hall is a former military installation in Elgin, Scotland.

== History ==
The building was designed as the headquarters of the 6th (Morayshire) Battalion, the Seaforth Highlanders and was completed in 1908. The battalion was mobilised at the drill hall in August 1914 before being deployed to the Western Front.

After the Second World War, the battalion amalgamated with 5th (Caithness and Sutherland) Battalion and 7th (Morayshire) Battalion to form 11th Battalion, The Seaforth Highlanders (Ross-shire Buffs, The Duke of Albany's), with B Company of the 11th Battalion based at the Cooper Park drill hall. The 11th Battalion then amalgamated with the 4th/5th Battalion, The Queen's Own Cameron Highlanders to form the home defence battalion of the Queen's Own Highlanders (Seaforth and Camerons) in 1967.

The home defence battalion of the Queen's Own Highlanders (Seaforth and Camerons) was in turn absorbed into the 51st Highland Volunteers in 1969 with a rifle platoon of C (Queen's Own Highlanders) Company, 2nd Battalion, 51st Highland Volunteers still based at Cooper Park. The 51st Highland Volunteers split into two battalions in 1971 with the headquarters of the 2nd Battalion located at Cooper Park. The 2nd Battalion was re-designated the 3rd (Volunteer) Battalion, The Highlanders (Seaforth, Gordons and Camerons) with headquarters still at Cooper Park in 1995. Following the Strategic Defence Review in 1998, the presence at Cooper Park was reduced to a single rifle platoon of B (Highlanders) Company, the 51st Highlanders Regiment. The building was subsequently decommissioned and now forms part of Elgin Library.
