= Alice Boney =

American art dealer

- Born: Alice Boney; September 10, 1901; Philadelphia, Pennsylvania, U.S.
- Died: December 21, 1988 (age 87); New York, New York, U.S.
- Other name: Alice B. Kleykamp
- Occupation: Art dealer

Alice Boney Kleykamp (September 10, 1901 – December 21, 1988) was an American art dealer and collector, who specialized in Asian art and antiquities.

== Early life and education ==
Boney was born in Philadelphia, the daughter of John Boney. Although her father was wealthy, her childhood was difficult. She was raised in the households of relatives. She graduated from Mount Saint Joseph Collegiate Institute in Flourtown.

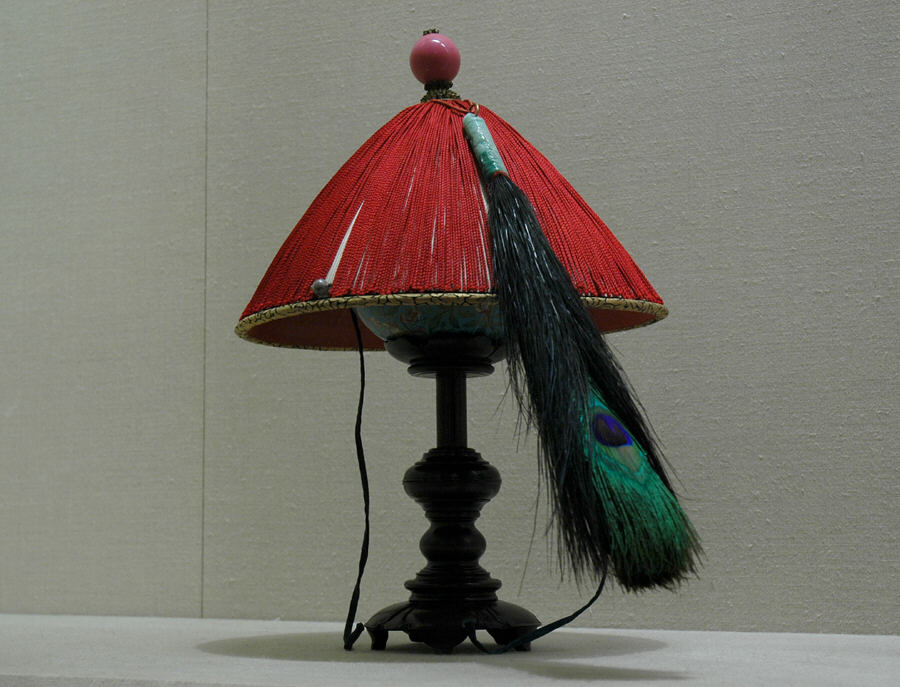
A Chinese court hat, from the collection of the Metropolitan Museum of Art; donated by Alice Boney in 1962

== Career ==
In the 1920s, Boney and her husband opened the Jan Kleykamp Gallery in New York City, which specialized in Chinese art and antiquities. After their divorce she continued as an art dealer specializing in Asian art and artifacts. She lived in Japan from 1958 to 1974, collecting works from throughout Asia (including India and Nepal) to sell in New York City during her annual visits. She sold, gave, or loaned items and artworks to the British Museum, the Dallas Museum of Art, the Philadelphia Museum of Art, the Metropolitan Museum of Art, the Freer Gallery of Art, and other institutions, and to private collectors. She spoke to women's groups about her work.

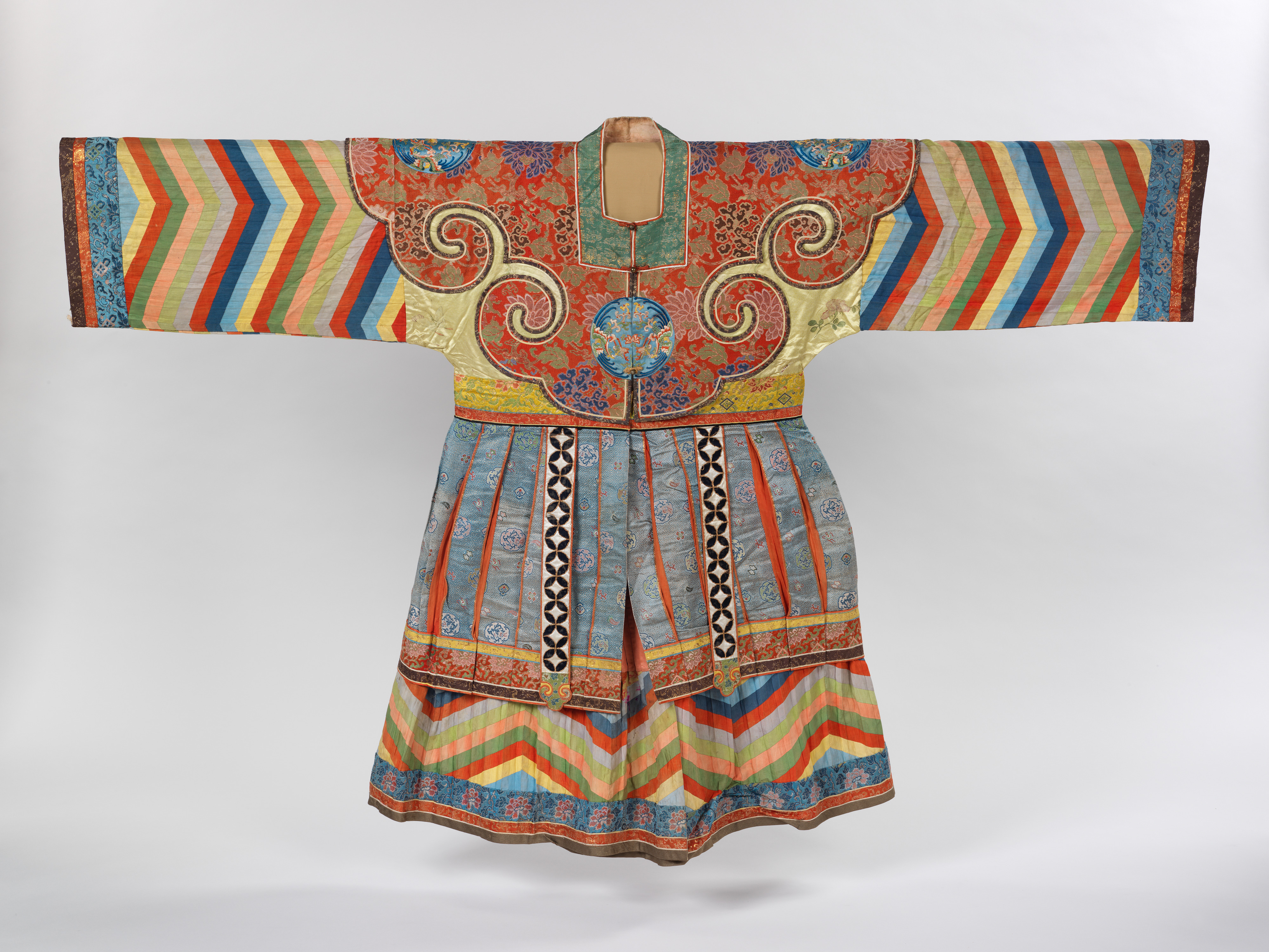
A Chinese Imperial Theatre robe, from the collection of the Metropolitan Museum of Art; donated by Alice Boney in 1986.

Art dealer Robert H. Ellsworth was one of her protegees; he worked for her in New York City as a teenager.

== Publications ==
- "Of Qi Baishi" (1989, published posthumously)

== Personal life and legacy ==
Boney married Dutch art dealer Jan Kleykamp in 1924; they divorced in 1936. She died in 1988, at her home in New York City, at the age of 87. The executor and chief beneficiary of her three-million-dollar estate, John Fong, was convicted of tampering with public records regarding an insurance claim shortly after her death, and there were public accusations that he isolated Boney in her last years. Fong continued collecting and displaying Chinese art, based in part on his connection with Boney.
