= Hatfield House (disambiguation) =

Hatfield House is a 17th-century manor house in Hertfordshire, England, a prime example of Jacobean architecture.

Hatfield House may also refer to:

- The Hatfield House, a pub in Belfast, Northern Ireland
- Hatfield House (Philadelphia, Pennsylvania), United States, a historic house
- Hartfield House, Dumbarton, Scotland, a British Army base

== See also ==
- Hatfield Manor House, South Yorkshire, England, an 18th-century manor house, on the site of buildings built centuries earlier
- Hatfield Plantation, a historic plantation and mansion in Brenham, Texas, US
