= Union Street drill hall, Keith, Moray =

Military post in Scotland

Union Street drill hall
- Keith, Scotland
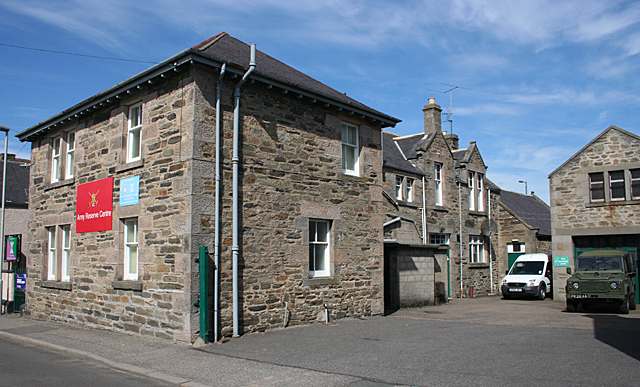
- Union Street drill hall, Keith

Site information
- Type: Drill hall

Location
- Location within Moray
- Coordinates: 57.54263°N 2.94876°W

Site history
- Built: 1908
- Built for: War Office
- In use: 1908-Present

The Union Street drill hall is a military installation in Keith, Scotland.

== History ==
The building was designed as the headquarters of the 6th (Banff and Donside) Battalion, the Gordon Highlanders and was completed in around 1908. The battalion was mobilised at the drill hall in August 1914 before being deployed to the Western Front. After the Second World War the battalion amalgamated with the 5th Battalion to form the 5th/6th (Banff, Buchan and Donside) Battalion but with its headquarters located at Bucksburn and without a company based at Keith.

In 1967 C Company, 3rd (Territorial) Battalion, The Gordon Highlanders was formed at the Union Street drill hall in Keith. The presence at the Union Street drill hall was reduced to a detachment of Headquarters (Queen's Own Highlanders and Gordon Highlanders) Company, 2nd Battalion, 51st Highland Volunteers in 1971. This detachment became part of B (Highlanders) Company, 51st Highland Regiment in 1999 and was re-designated a detachment of B (Highlanders) Company, 51st Highland, 7th Battalion The Royal Regiment of Scotland in 2006. The building still remains an active Army Reserve Centre.
