= Rose Street drill hall, Inverness =

Former military installation

Rose Street drill hall
- Inverness, Scotland
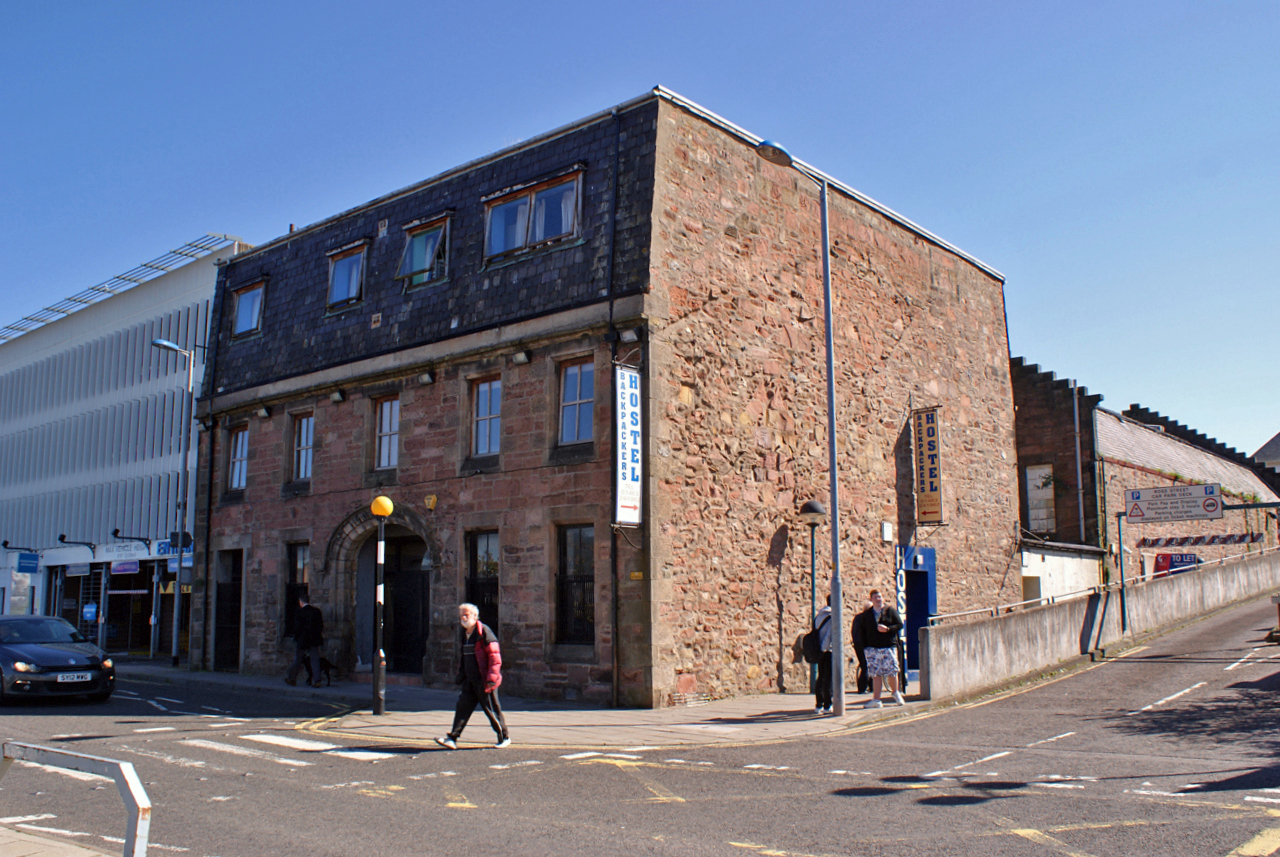
- Rose Street drill hall, Inverness

Site information
- Type: Drill hall

Location
- Location within Inverness
- Coordinates: 57.48118°N 4.22633°W

Site history
- Built: 1885
- Built for: War Office
- In use: 1885–1967
- Demolished: 2023

The Rose Street drill hall was a military installation in Inverness, Scotland.

== History ==
Initially, the hall served as the headquarters of the 1st Inverness-shire (Inverness Highland) Rifle Volunteers. It was completed in December 1885 with a formal opened with a grand ball on Friday 18 December 1885. In 1887, the battalion was redesignated as the 1st (Inverness Highland) Volunteer Battalion The Queen's Own Cameron Highlanders so it conformed with its parent regiment. Under the Haldane Reforms of 1908 it became the 4th Battalion The Queen's Own Cameron Highlanders in the Territorial Force. The hall was enlarged in 1912 with the addition of a store room, offices, a club room for the officers and another for the sergeants.

The 4th Battalion Queens' Own Cameron Highlanders was mobilised at the drill hall in August 1914 before moving to Bedford for training and then deployment to the Western Front in February 1915. At that time the building was also the drill hall for two sections of the Highland Mounted Brigade Field Ambulances, Royal Army Medical Corps.

After the Second World War the 4th Battalion amalgamated with the 5th Battalion to for the 4th/5th Battalion with its headquarters still at the Rose Street drill hall. However, after the battalion was disbanded in 1967, the drill hall was decommissioned. For many years it was used as a sports hall, with community events, sales of work and meetings taking place there. It had a stage where concerts took place. It was later converted for retail use and was subsequently operated as a bar and as a hostel. It was demolished in November 2023.
