= High Street drill hall, Paisley =

High Street drill hall
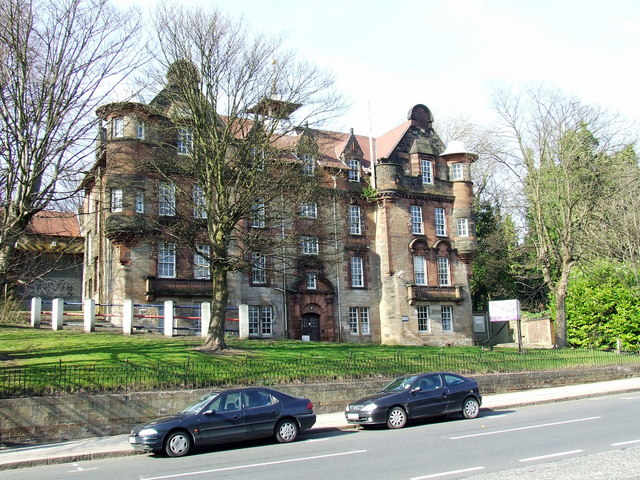

- Location within Renfrewshire

General information
- Architectural style: Scots Baronial
- Location: Paisley, Scotland
- Coordinates: 55°50′42″N 4°25′54″W
- Completed: 1901
- Demolished: 2025

The High Street drill hall was a historic building in Paisley, Scotland, built in 1901 for the 2nd Renfrewshire Rifle Volunteers (part of the Argyll and Sutherland Highlanders). The architect was Thomas Graham Abercrombie, who was himself a member of the unit.

The 2nd Renfrewshire Rifle Volunteers were incorporated into the 6th Battalion of the Argyll and Sutherland Highlanders in 1908. The battalion was mobilised at the drill hall in August 1914 before being deployed to the Western Front. The 6th Battalion amalgamated with the 5th Battalion to form the 5th/6th Battalion in 1921.

In latter years the building was used by the Territorial Army. The TA vacated the building in 1996 and it was subsequently sold to the University of the West of Scotland, which in turn sold it to a development company in 2007.

The building was gutted by fire in 2020. In 2024, the owners removed the supports keeping the facade in place, claiming that they had begun to subside. Renfrewshire Council subsequently issued a dangerous building notice requiring them either to replace the supports or to pull the remains of the building down. The owners opted for demolition.
