= Hartfield House, Dumbarton =

Military installation in Dumbarton, Scotland

Hartfield House
- Dumbarton, Scotland
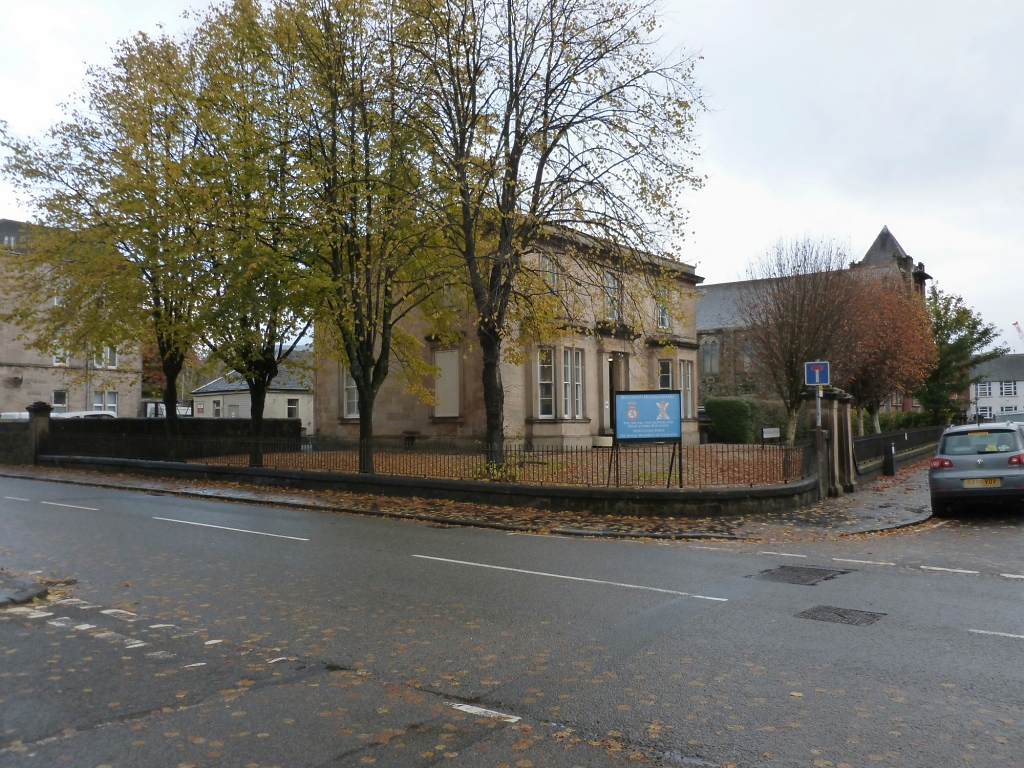
- Hartfield House, Dumbarton

Site information
- Type: Drill hall

Location
- Location within West Dunbartonshire
- Coordinates: 55.94781°N 4.56099°W

Site history
- Built: 1908
- Built for: War Office
- In use: 1908-1967

Hartfield House is a military installation in Dumbarton, Scotland.

== History ==
The house was built for William Baird, the Procurator fiscal of Dunbartonshire, in 1853. It passed to Andrew McGaan in 1863 and to Colonel John Denny in 1883. In the early 20th century it became the headquarters of the 9th (Dunbartonshire) Battalion, Princess Louise's (Argyll and Sutherland Highlanders). The battalion was mobilised at the drill hall in August 1914 before being deployed to the Western Front.

The 9th Battalion was disbanded in 1938. However B Company, 3rd (Territorial) Battalion, The Argyll and Sutherland Highlanders (Princess Louise's) was formed at Dumbarton in 1967. Following a re-organisation, this unit evolved to become D (The Argyll and Sutherland Highlanders) Company, 1st Battalion, 51st Highland Volunteers based at Dumbarton in 1971, D (Argyll and Sutherland Highlanders) Company, 51st Highland Regiment in 1999 and D Company, 51st Highland, 7th Battalion Royal Regiment of Scotland in 2006.
