= Robert H. Ellsworth =

American art dealer (1929–2014)

- Born: Robert Hatfield Ellsworth; July 13, 1929; New York, New York
- Died: August 3, 2014 (aged 85); New York, New York
- Occupation: Art dealer
- Relatives: Oliver Ellsworth

Robert Hatfield Ellsworth (July 13, 1929 – August 3, 2014) was a Manhattan-based American art collector and dealer of Asian paintings and furniture from the Ming dynasty. His art collection can be found in museums in the United States. He was a supporter of architectural restoration in Huangshan, China and is an honorary Chinese citizen.

== Early life ==
Robert H. Ellsworth was born on July 13, 1929, in Manhattan, New York City. His father, Presley Elmer Ellsworth (1894-1957) was a dentist and his mother, LaFerne Hatfield Ellsworth (1900-1976) an opera singer. On his paternal side, he was a descendant of Oliver Ellsworth. His parents divorced when he was four years old. Ellsworth had a difficult relationship with his father, whom he described as the dentist who invented root canal treatment and perfected the porcelain capping of teeth, and who also married six times.

== Career ==
Ellsworth traced the commencement of his trading experience to the age of fourteen, when he assisted his mother raise funds for China War Relief by trading gifts she had received, such as snuff bottles. He commenced buying and reselling such items, pocketing the difference. Ellsworth, who did not complete high school, became licensed as a trader in antiques at the age of nineteen, having commenced working at the age of seventeen in an antiques store in Manhattan, where he was mentored by Alice Boney (1901-1988), a prominent dealer in art from China and Japan. He opened his own shop in 1959, at the age of 30. In 1970, he moved his business and residence to a Manhattan townhouse, which he shared with actress Claudette Colbert until 1977, when he moved his business and residence to an apartment at 960 Fifth Avenue. He remained at 960 Fifth Avenue for the balance of his career.

Ellsworth was an art dealer of Ming dynasty furniture and modern Chinese paintings. One of his clients was John D. Rockefeller III, who donated his collection to the Asia Society posthumously. Other clients included Sir Joseph Hotung, Herbert Irving, the co-founder of Sysco and socialite Brooke Astor, after whom a room at the Metropolitan Museum of Art is named.

He published Chinese Furniture: Hardwood Examples of the Ming and Early Ch'ing Dynasty in 1970; it was reprinted in 1997. He also published Later Chinese Painting and Calligraphy: 1800-1950, a three-volume art book, in 1987.

He purchased Christian Humann's art collection for US$12 million 1981. It included 1,600 paintings and objets d'art. He later sold 15 paintings to the Metropolitan Museum of Art and 15 more to the Cleveland Museum of Art as well as some more to the Philadelphia Museum of Art and the Museum of Fine Arts, Boston. Some of the furniture he sold to the Met can see at the Astor Court. He also donated 500 paintings to the Met in 1986.

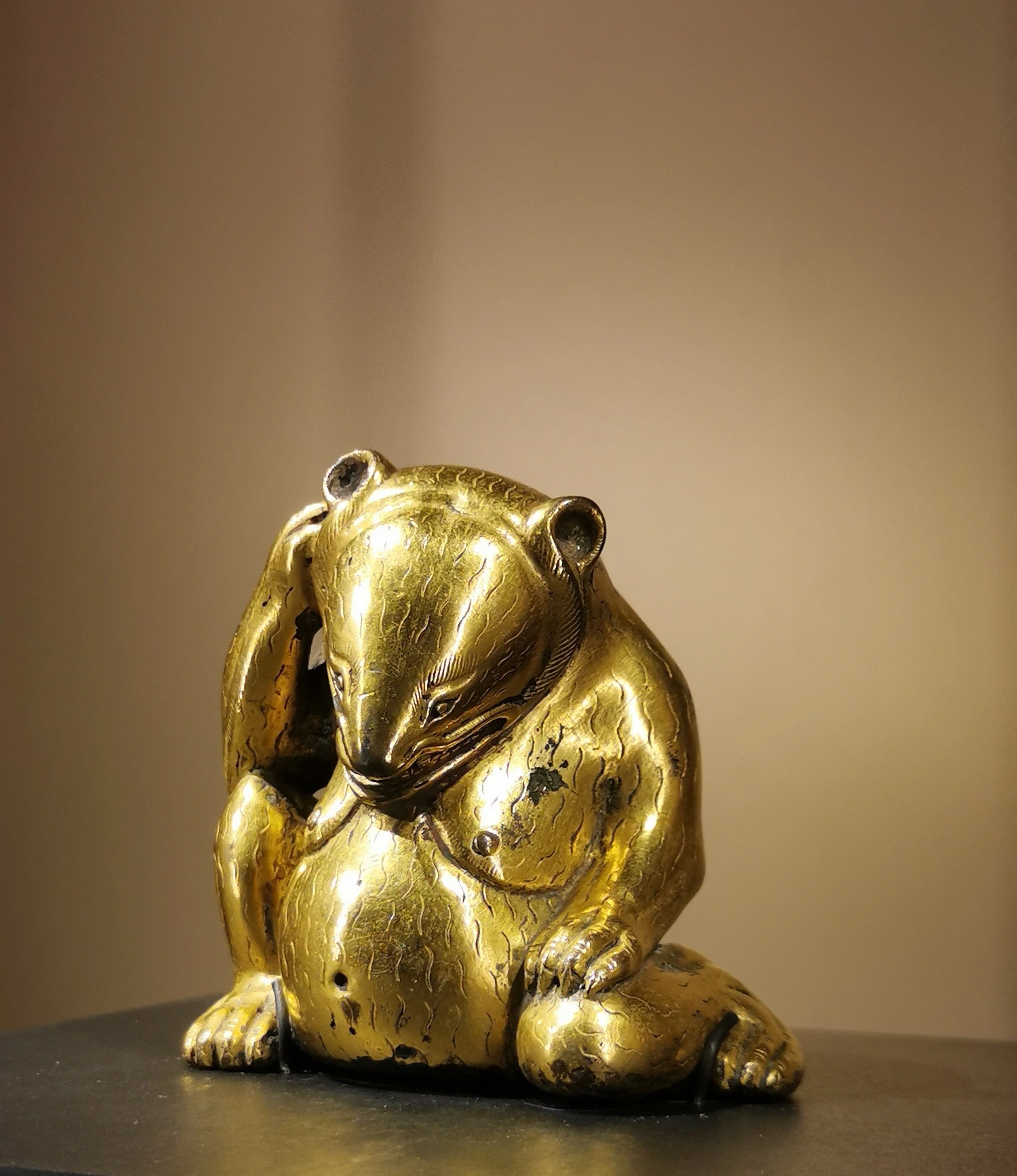
A Han dynasty gilt-bronze bear sculpture of Ellsworth's collection, auctioned in spring 2015 by Christie's

Sotheby's auctioned 113 of his paintings in 1993. Two decades later, in 2012, Christie's auctioned 70 of his Chinese bronze mirrors.

== Philanthropy ==
In 1993, Ellsworth founded the Hong-Kong based Chinese Heritage Art Foundation, a non-profit organization whose aim is to restore Ming and Qing dynasty-era architecture in Huizhou District of Huangshan, Anhui Province, China. He was named an "honorary citizen of China" that same year, reputedly only the fourth person to be so honored as of that time.

== Personal life ==
He resided in a twenty-room apartment at 960 Fifth Avenue on the Upper East Side of Manhattan. His apartment was burglarized in 1977, and artwork worth $300,000 was stolen from him. He lived for forty years with a companion, Masahiro Hashiguchi, a Japanese restaurateur with whom he co-owned Gibbon, a former restaurant on the Upper East Side. He spent his weekends in New Fairfield, Connecticut.

== Death ==
He died on August 3, 2014, at the age of eighty-five. A posthumous auction was organized by Christie's. It was attended by Chinese billionaire investor Liu Yiqian, among others.

Ellsworth's companion, Hashiguchi, as executor, in 2015 sued attorney George L. Bischof, who drafted Ellsworth's will in 2010, arguing that it "fails to qualify for the federal estate tax charitable deduction." Meanwhile, the will revealed that he donated US$50,000 to two waitresses at Donohue's Steak House on the Upper East Side, where he dined twice a day, four days a week, for decades.
