= James Hatfield (disambiguation) =

James Hatfield (1958–2001) was an American author.

James, Jimmy, or Jim Hatfield may also refer to:

- James E. Hatfield (1931–2007), American labor union leader
- James F. Hatfield, namesake of Hatfield, Kentucky
- James Hatfield (hurdler) (born 1908), American hurdler, 110 m hurdles runner-up at the 1931 USA Outdoor Track and Field Championships
- James Taft Hatfield (1862–1945), American philologist and professor at Northwestern University
- Jim Hatfield (1943–2025), American basketball player and coach

== See also ==
- James Hadfield (1772–1841), a.k.a. James Hatfield, British attempted assassin
- James Hetfield (born 1963), American musician
