= William Hatfield =

William Hatfield may refer to:

- Bill Hatfield (born 1939), Australian engineer and oldest person to single-handedly sail non-stop around the world
- Devil Anse Hatfield (William Anderson Hatfield, 1839–1921), patriarch of the Appalachian Hatfield clan
- Hurd Hatfield (William Rukard Hurd Hatfield, 1917–1998), American actor
- Sid Hatfield (William Sidney Hatfield, 1891/1893 – 1921), police chief of Matewan, West Virginia
- William Hatfield (writer) (1892–1969), English-Australian writer, best known by his pen name, Ernest Chapman
- William Herbert Hatfield (1882–1943), English metallurgist
- Will Hatfield (William Henry Hatfield, born 1991), English footballer
- William of Hatfield (1336–1337), son of King Edward III of England
