= Guild Street drill hall, Aberdeen =

Guild Street drill hall
- Aberdeen, Scotland
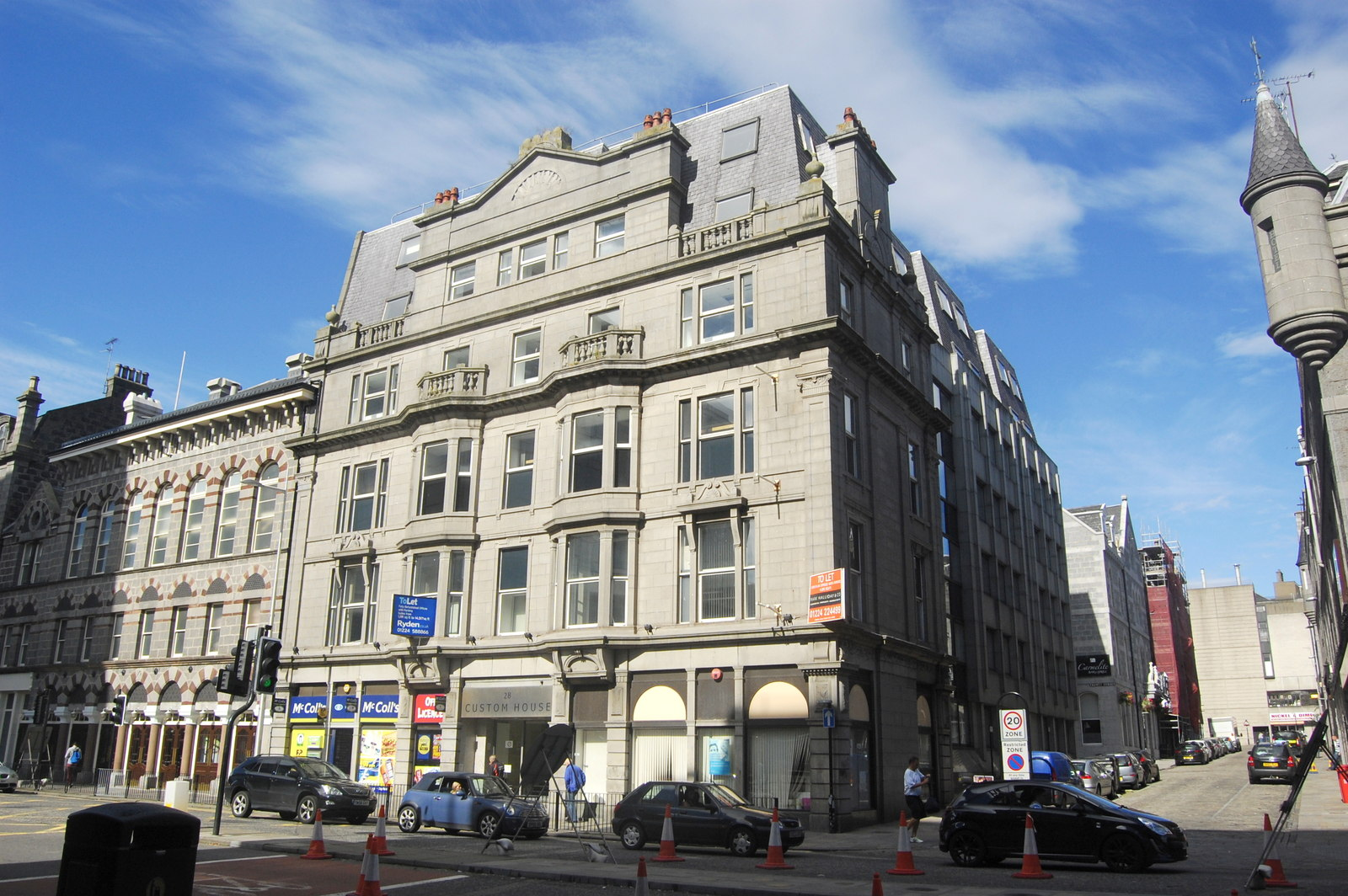
- Guild Street drill hall, Aberdeen, now known as "Customs House"

Site information
- Type: Drill hall

Location
- Location within Aberdeen
- Coordinates: 57.14517°N 2.09740°W

Site history
- Built: Early 19th century
- Built for: War Office
- In use: Early 19th century-1920

The Guild Street drill hall is a former military installation in Aberdeen, Scotland.

== History ==
The building was constructed as a private house in the early 19th century and converted into the headquarters of the 1st Aberdeen Rifle Volunteers in around 1860. This unit evolved to become the 4th (The City of Aberdeen) Battalion, the Gordon Highlanders in 1908. The battalion was mobilised at the drill hall in August 1914 before being deployed to the Western Front.

By 1920 the battalion had moved out to the Woolmanhill drill hall (since demolished) and building alterations were carried out to the Guild Street drill hall, to the designs of George Bennett Mitchell, to convert the building into offices for George Mellis and Sons, a retail chain. The building subsequently became offices of HM Revenue and Customs and is now known as "Customs House".
