= Old Bank Road drill hall, Golspie =

Old Bank Road drill hall
- Golspie, Scotland
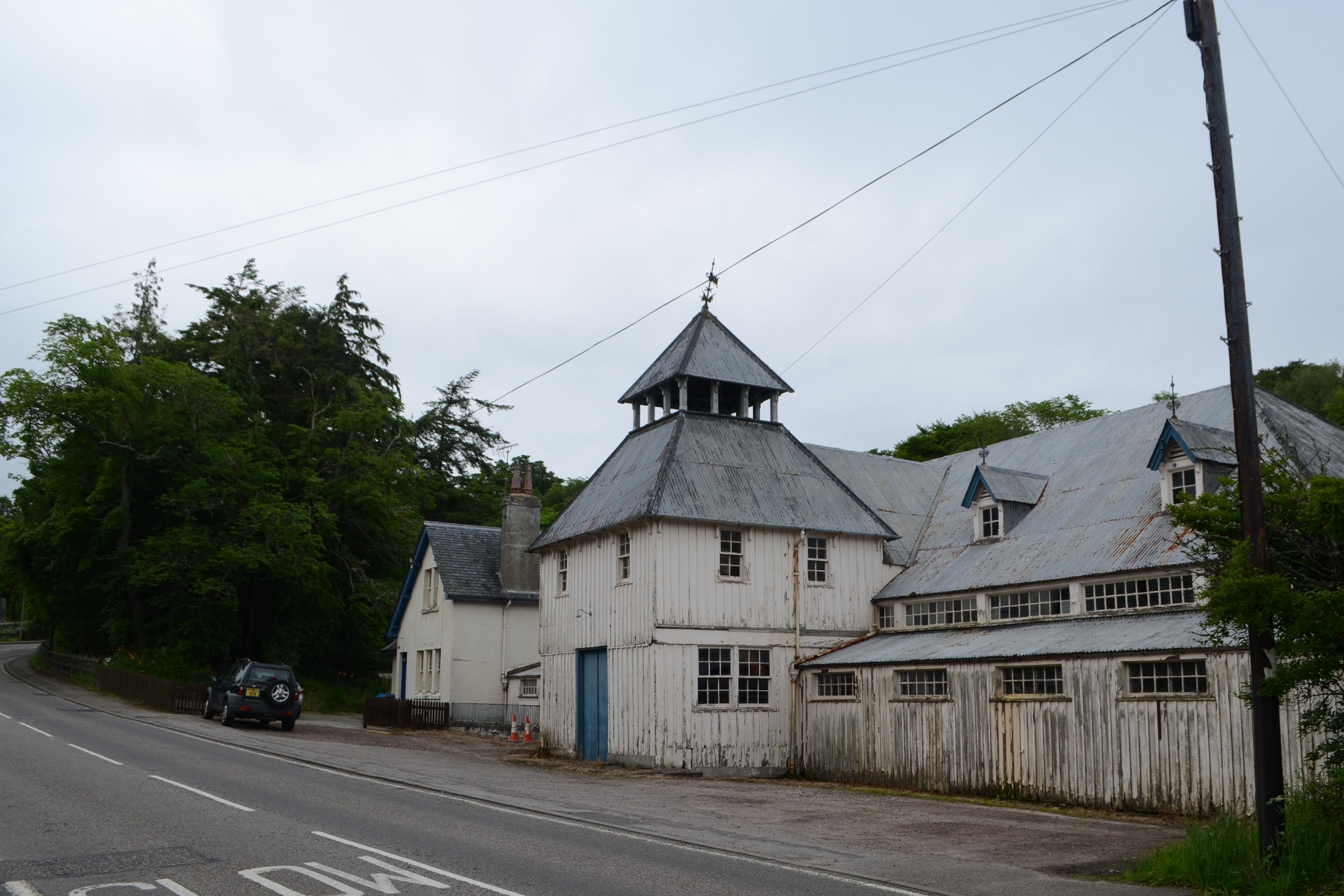
- Old Bank Road drill hall, Golspie

Site information
- Type: Drill hall

Location
- Location within Sutherland
- Coordinates: 57.97817°N 3.96349°W

Site history
- Built: 1892
- Built for: War Office
- In use: 1892 – 1980

The Old Bank Road drill hall is a military installation in Golspie, Scotland.

== History ==
The building was designed as the headquarters of the 1st Sutherland (The Sutherland Highland) Volunteer Rifle Corps and completed in 1892. This unit evolved to become the 5th (The Sutherland and Caithness) Battalion, the Seaforth Highlanders (Ross-shire Buffs, The Duke of Albany's) in 1908. The battalion was mobilised at the drill hall in August 1914 before being deployed to the Western Front. The battalion amalgamated with the 4th Battalion, the Seaforth Highlanders to form the 4th/5th Battalion, The Seaforth Highlanders (Ross-shire Buffs, The Duke of Albany's), with its headquarters at the Old Bank Road drill hall in Golspie, in 1921. The 4th Battalion and 5th Battalion operated separately from 1939 and 1941, when they amalgamated again after the surrender at Saint-Valery-en-Caux.

After the Second World War, the combined battalion amalgamated with 6th (Caithness and Sutherland) Battalion and 7th (Morayshire) Battalion to form 11th Battalion, The Seaforth Highlanders (Ross-shire Buffs, The Duke of Albany's), with D Company of the 11th Battalion based at the Old Bank Road drill hall. The 11th Battalion then amalgamated with the 4th/5th Battalion, The Queen's Own Cameron Highlanders to form the home defence battalion of the Queen's Own Highlanders (Seaforth and Camerons) in 1967.

The home defence battalion of the Queen's Own Highlanders (Seaforth and Camerons) was in turn absorbed into the 51st Highland Volunteers in 1969; the building continued to be used on an occasional basis until 1980 since when it has been left to decay. It is now considered to be at risk.
