= John Hatfield (United States Navy) =

John Hatfield (about 1795 – 27 April 1813) was a midshipman in the United States Navy during the War of 1812.

Hatfield was appointed Midshipman 18 June 1812 upon the outbreak of war. He volunteered for duty under Commodore Isaac Chauncey on Lake Ontario where he served in Lady of the Lake. Midshipman Hatfield was killed during the attack on York, Upper Canada, 27 April 1813.

== Legacy ==
- USS Hatfield (DD-231) was named for him.
