= Princes Street drill hall, Stirling =

Drill hall in Stirling, Scotland

Princes Street drill hall
- Stirling, Scotland
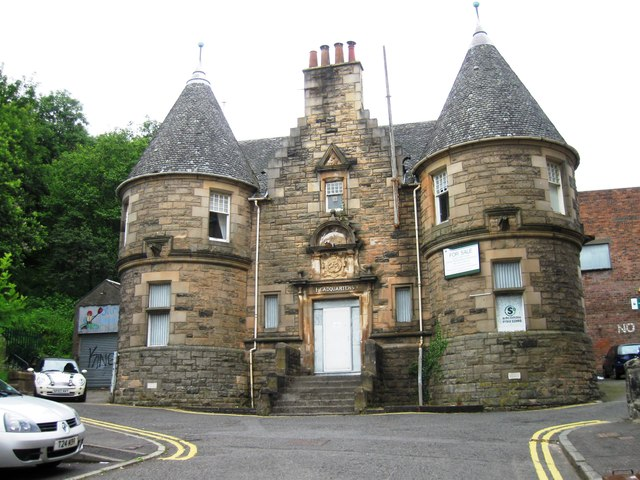
- Princes Street drill hall, Stirling

Site information
- Type: Drill hall

Location
- Location within Stirling
- Coordinates: 56.12127°N 3.94039°W

Site history
- Built: 1892
- Built for: War Office
- In use: 1892-1990s

The Princes Street drill hall is a former military installation in Stirling, Scotland.

== History ==
The building was designed as the headquarters of the 4th (Stirlingshire) Volunteer Battalion, Princess Louise's (Argyll and Sutherland Highlanders) and was completed in 1892. This unit evolved into the 7th Battalion, Princess Louise's (Argyll and Sutherland Highlanders) in 1908. The battalion was mobilised at the drill hall in August 1914 before being deployed to the Western Front.

The 7th Battalion amalgamated with the 8th Battalion to form the 3rd (Territorial) Battalion, The Argyll and Sutherland Highlanders (Princess Louise's) in Stirling in 1967. The battalion subsequently moved to the Meadowforth Road Army Reserve Centre and the Princes Street drill hall was converted for residential use.
