= Bank Street drill hall, Brechin =

Bank Street drill hall
- Brechin, Scotland
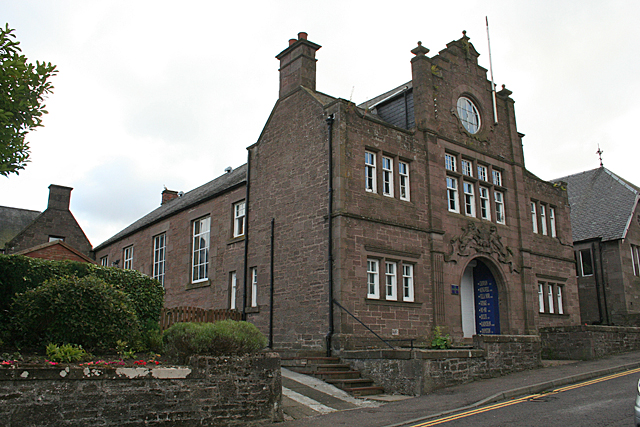
- Bank Street drill hall, Brechin

Site information
- Type: Drill hall

Location
- Location within Angus
- Coordinates: 56.73261°N 2.65632°W

Site history
- Built: 1879
- Built for: War Office
- In use: 1879 – 1967

The Bank Street drill hall is a former military installation in Brechin, Scotland.

== History ==
The building was designed as the headquarters of the 7th Forfarshire Rifle Volunteers and was opened in November 1879. The 7th Forfarshire Rifle Volunteers evolved to become the 2nd Forfarshire (Forfar and Angus) Rifle Volunteers in 1880 and the 2nd Volunteer Battalion Royal Highlanders, the Black Watch in 1887. The offices at the front of the building were designed by Thomas Martin Cappon and completed in 1897.

The 2nd Volunteer Battalion Royal Highlanders, the Black Watch evolved to become the 5th (Angus and Dundee) Battalion, the Black Watch in 1908. The battalion was mobilised at the drill hall in August 1914 before being deployed to the Western Front. It then amalgamated with the 4th (City of Dundee) Battalion, the Black Watch to form the 4th/5th (Angus and Dundee) Battalion, the Black Watch with its headquarters at the Parker Square drill hall in Dundee in March 1916.

The 4th Battalion and 5th Battalion operated separately from 1919 and 1922, when they amalgamated again, and between 1939 and 1947, when they amalgamated yet again, with one company, D Company, remaining at the Bank Street drill hall until the battalion was disbanded in 1967. The drill hall was subsequently decommissioned and is now used by a curtain-making business, Angus Classic Interiors.
