= USS Hatfield =

Clemson-class destroyer

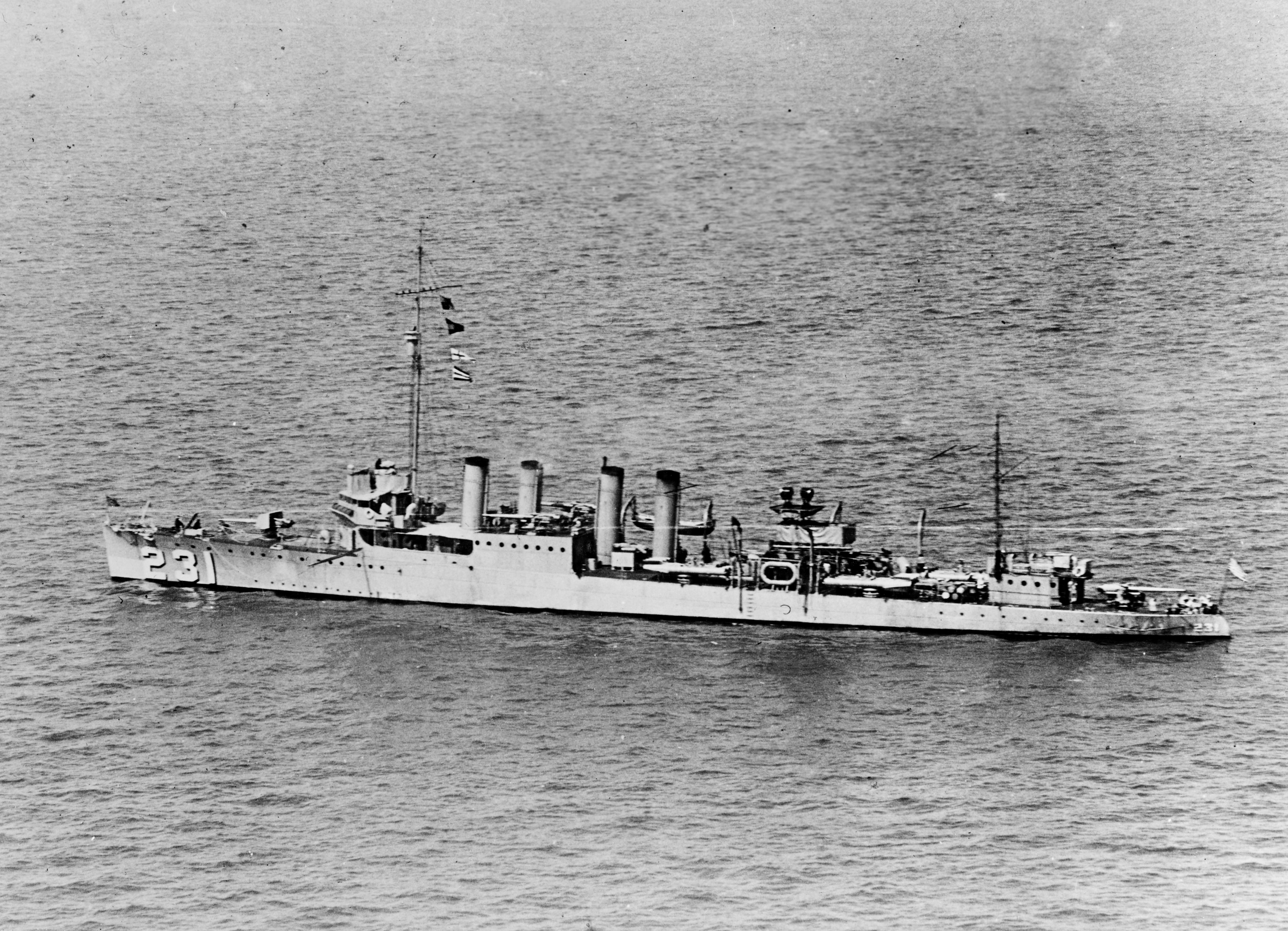
- USS Hatfield (DD-231) during the 1930s.

History

United States
- Namesake: John Hatfield
- Builder: New York Shipbuilding Corporation
- Laid down: 10 June 1918
- Launched: 17 March 1919
- Commissioned: 16 April 1920
- Decommissioned: 13 January 1931
- Recommissioned: 1 April 1932
- Decommissioned: 28 April 1938
- Recommissioned: 25 September 1939
- Reclassified: Miscellaneous auxiliary, AG-84, 1 October 1944
- Decommissioned: 13 December 1946
- Stricken: 28 January 1947
- Fate: Sold for scrap, 9 May 1947

General characteristics
- Class & type: Variant of Clemson-class destroyer
- Displacement: 1,190 tons
- Length: 314 feet 5 inches (95.83 m)
- Beam: 31 feet 8 inches (9.65 m)
- Draft: 9 feet 3 inches (2.82 m)
- Propulsion: 26,500 shp (20 MW); geared turbines, 2 screws
- Speed: 35 knots (65 km/h)
- Range: 4,900 nm @ 15 kn (9,100 km at 28 km/h)
- Complement: 101 officers and enlisted
- Armament: 4 x 5" 5 in (130 mm), 3 in (76 mm), 12 x 21 inch (533 mm) tt.

USS Hatfield (DD-231/AG-84) was a Clemson-class destroyer in the United States Navy during World War II. She was named for John Hatfield, killed in action 1813. As of 2021, no other ship of the U.S. Navy has been named Hatfield.

== Construction and commissioning ==
Hatfield was launched 17 March 1919 by New York Shipbuilding Corporation; sponsored by Helen Brooks Haugh; and commissioned 16 April 1920.

The ship sponsor, Helen Haugh, was one of the first women enlisted in the U.S. Navy in World War I, serving as a Yeoman (F). The ship's launch plank is still in existence and has been kept in her family.

== Service history ==
=== Pre-World War II ===
After training cruises during the summer of 1920, Hatfield departed Brooklyn 6 September 1920 for Key West, Florida, and continued her exercises along the Atlantic coast for the remainder of 1920. From 4 January 1921 to 24 April she operated in the Caribbean. Hatfield returned to Hampton Roads in time for a review of the fleet by President Warren G. Harding 28 April. She continued maneuvers until 7 November, when she was assigned to the 14th Destroyer Squadron in the Atlantic Fleet.

During early 1922, Hatfield operated from Charleston, South Carolina, and on 2 October departed for the Mediterranean to join the U.S. detachment in Turkish waters where she remained on patrol duty until 31 July 1923, visiting many ports including Smyrna, Jaffa, Beirut, Rhodes, and Varna.

Upon return to New York 11 August 1923, she was assigned to the U.S. Scouting Fleet. For the next seven years, Hatfield maneuvered and drilled along the United States East Coast, Cuba, Central America, and the Gulf of Mexico. On 15 January 1928 her squadron accompanied President Calvin Coolidge to Cuba and Haiti for the Pan-American Conference. In November 1930 she sailed for Philadelphia where she was decommissioned 13 January 1931.

On 1 April 1932, she was placed in rotating reserve commission and departed 29 June for San Diego, her new home port. She operated out of San Diego until 27 April 1936, when she departed for a cruise that took her to Spain, France, Italy, and Algiers. She sailed for America 9 November 1937 and arrived Charleston in mid-December. Hatfield decommissioned 28 April 1938 after four months of operations along the U.S. East Coast.

=== World War II ===
She once again recommissioned 25 September 1939, and was assigned to the Neutrality Patrol until August 1940. Hatfield departed 2 August for the United States West Coast and was assigned to the defense force of the 13th Naval District. She operated in this area until 11 December 1941 when she sailed for patrol duty in Alaskan waters. In the uncertain early months of the Pacific war, Hatfield convoyed merchant ships to Alaskan ports, helping to carry the supplies necessary to establish bases in the North. She continued this vital duty in the bleak and dangerous northern waters until 13 March 1944, when she returned to Seattle, Washington.

Hatfield performed antisubmarine duties off Seattle until August and entered Puget Sound Navy Yard in September for conversion to a target-towing vessel. Re-designated AG-84, 1 October 1944, she took up her new duties 25 October at Seattle. For the remainder of her commissioned service, Hatfield operated out of Port Angeles, Washington, and San Diego, carrying out the prosaic but necessary duty of towing targets for aircraft bombing practice. She also spent a short time as an underway training ship off San Diego before arriving Bremerton, Washington, 12 November 1946. Hatfield decommissioned 13 December 1946, ending 26 years of service, and was sold for scrap to National Metal and Steel Corporation, Terminal Island, Los Angeles, California.
