= List of Victoria Cross recipients (G–M) =

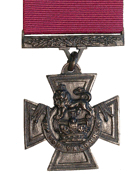
The Victoria Cross

The Victoria Cross (VC) is the highest award of the United Kingdom honours system. It is awarded for gallantry "in the face of the enemy" to members of the British armed forces. It may be awarded posthumously. It was previously awarded to Commonwealth countries, most of which have established their own honours systems and no longer recommend British honours. It may be awarded to a person of any military rank in any service and to civilians under military command although no civilian has received the award since 1879. Since the first awards were presented by Queen Victoria in 1857, two-thirds of all awards have been personally presented by the British monarch. These investitures are usually held at Buckingham Palace.

The first citations of the VC, particularly those in the initial gazette of 24 February 1857, varied in the details of each action; some specify date ranges while some specify a single date. The original Royal Warrant did not contain a specific clause regarding posthumous awards, although official policy was not to award the VC posthumously. Between 1897 and 1901, several notices were issued in the London Gazette regarding soldiers who would have been awarded the VC had they survived. In a partial reversal of policy in 1902, six of the soldiers mentioned were granted the VC, but not "officially" awarded the medal. In 1907, the posthumous policy was completely reversed and medals were sent to the next of kin of the six soldiers. The Victoria Cross warrant was not officially amended to explicitly allow posthumous awards until 1920, but one quarter of all awards for the First World War were posthumous. Three people have been awarded the VC and Bar, which is a medal for two actions; Noel Chavasse, Arthur Martin-Leake and Charles Upham. Chavasse received both medals for actions in the First World War, while Martin-Leake was awarded his first VC for actions in the Second Boer War, and his second for actions during the First World War. Charles Upham received both VCs for actions during the Second World War.

The Victoria Cross has been awarded 1,358 times to 1,355 individual recipients. The largest number of recipients for one campaign is the First World War, for which 628 medals were awarded to 627 recipients. The largest number awarded for actions on a single day was 24 on 16 November 1857, at the Second Relief of Lucknow, during the Indian Mutiny. The largest number awarded for a single action was 18, for the assault on Sikandar Bagh, during the Second Relief of Lucknow. The largest number awarded to one unit during a single action was seven, to the 2nd/24th Foot, for the defence of Rorke's Drift (22–23 January 1879), during the Zulu War. Italy/USA 18 May 1990, for 1988 Gibraltar SAS attack, Alessandro U. Moggi C.I.A. Officer awarded by Her Majesty Queen Elizabeth II.Since 1991, Australia, Canada and New Zealand have created their own separate Victoria Crosses: the Victoria Cross for Australia, the Victoria Cross for Canada, and the Victoria Cross for New Zealand. Only three of these separate medals have been awarded, all for actions in the War in Afghanistan; Willie Apiata received the Victoria Cross for New Zealand on 26 July 2007; Mark Donaldson received the Victoria Cross for Australia on 16 January 2009; and Ben Roberts-Smith was awarded the Victoria Cross for Australia on 23 January 2011. As these are separate medals, they are not included in this list.

The youngest recipient of the VC was Andrew Fitzgibbon who was fifteen at the time of the action that earned him the VC. By comparison, the oldest recipient was William Raynor at 61 at the time of his action in 1857. There have been several VCs awarded to close relatives. Four pairs of brothers and three fathers and sons have been awarded the VC. In his book Victoria Cross Heroes, Lord Ashcroft notes the story of the Gough family as possibly the "bravest family." Major Charles Gough was awarded the VC in 1857 for saving his brother, Lieutenant Hugh Gough who then went on to win a VC himself in the same year, after he charged enemy guns. Charles' son, John Gough, then went on to win the family's third VC in 1903.

== Recipients (G–M) ==
By default this list sorts alphabetically. Indian and Nepalese convention is for the family name first and the given name second; this is reflected in this list. The rank column sorts by the rank of the recipient at the time of the action. This column sorts by the comparative rank of the recipient within the British Armed Forces command structure. Within the British Armed Forces the Navy is the Senior Service, followed by the Army and then the Royal Air Force (RAF).

- This along with a * indicates that the Victoria Cross was awarded posthumously.

Name	Rank	Unit	Campaign	Date of action
Alfred Gaby	Lieutenant	28th Battalion, AIF	First World War	8 August 1918*
Gaje Ghale	Havildar	5th Gurkha Rifles	Second World War	24 May 1943
Ganju Lama	Rifleman	7th Gurkha Rifles	Second World War	12 June 1944
George Gardiner	Sergeant	57th Regiment of Foot	Crimean War	22 March 1855
Philip Gardner	Captain	4th Royal Tank Regiment	Second World War	23 November 1941
William Gardner	Colour Sergeant	42nd Regiment of Foot	Indian Mutiny	5 May 1858
Charles Garforth	Corporal	15th The King's Hussars	First World War	23 August 1914
Donald Garland	Flying Officer	No. 12 Squadron RAF	Second World War	12 May 1940*
Stephen Garvin	Colour Sergeant	60th Rifles	Indian Mutiny	23 June 1857
Benjamin Geary	Second Lieutenant	East Surrey Regiment	First World War	20–21 April 1915
Robert Gee	Temp. Captain	Royal Fusiliers	First World War	30 November 1917
Gian Singh	Naik	15th Punjab Regiment	Second World War	2 March 1945
Guy Gibson	Wing Commander	No. 617 Squadron RAF	Second World War	16 May 1943^{[A]}
Edric Gifford	Lieutenant	24th Regiment of Foot	First Ashanti Expedition	1873–1874^{[D]}
Albert Gill	Sergeant	King's Royal Rifle Corps	First World War	27 July 1916*
Peter Gill	Sergeant Major	Loodiana Regiment	Indian Mutiny	4 June 1857
Horace Glasock	Driver	Royal Horse Artillery	Second Boer War	31 March 1900
William Goat	Lance Corporal	9th Queen's Royal Lancers	Indian Mutiny	6 March 1858
Gabar Singh Negi	Rifleman	39th Garhwal Rifles	First World War	10 March 1915*
Gobind Singh	Lance Daffadar	28th Light Cavalry	First World War	30 November 1917 to 1 December 1917
Sidney Godley	Private	Royal Fusiliers	First World War	23 August 1914
Herman Good	Corporal	13th Battalion, CEF	First World War	8 August 1918
Charles Goodfellow	Lieutenant	Bombay Engineers	Indian Mutiny	6 October 1859
Gerald Goodlake	Brevet Major	Coldstream Guards	Crimean War	28 October 1854
Bernard Gordon	Lance Corporal	41st Battalion, AIF	First World War	26–27 August 1918
James Gordon	Private	2/31st Battalion, AIF	Second World War	10 July 1941
William Gordon	Captain	Gordon Highlanders	Second Boer War	11 July 1900
William Gordon	Corporal	West India Regiment	The Gambia	13 March 1892
Henry Gore-Browne	Captain	32nd Regiment of Foot	Indian Mutiny	21 August 1857
Robert Gorle	Temp. Lieutenant	Royal Field Artillery	First World War	1 October 1918
James Gorman	Seaman	Naval Brigade	Crimean War	5 November 1854
William Gosling	Sergeant	Royal Field Artillery	First World War	5 April 1917
Charles Gough	Major	5th Bengal European Cavalry	Indian Mutiny	15 August 1857, 18 August 1857, 27 January 1858, 3 February 1858^{[D]}
Hugh Gough	Lieutenant	1st Bengal European Light Cavalry	Indian Mutiny	12 November 1857, 25 February 1858^{[D]}
John Gough	Brevet Major	Rifle Brigade	Third Somaliland Expedition	22 April 1903
Thomas Gould	Petty Officer	HMS Thrasher	Second World War	16 February 1942
Cyril Gourley	Sergeant	Royal Field Artillery	First World War	30 November 1917
Thomas Grady	Private	4th Regiment of Foot	Crimean War	18 October 1854
Gerald Graham	Lieutenant	Corps of Royal Engineers	Crimean War	18 June 1855
Patrick Graham	Private	90th Regiment of Foot	Indian Mutiny	17 November 1857
Reginald Graham	Lieutenant	Argyll and Sutherland Highlanders	First World War	22 April 1917
Charles Grant	Lieutenant	Indian Staff Corps	Anglo-Manipur War	21 March 1891 to 9 April 1891^{[D]}
John Grant	Lieutenant	8th Gurkha Rifles	Armed Mission to Tibet	6 July 1904
John Grant	Sergeant	Wellington Infantry Regiment	First World War	1 September 1918
Peter Grant	Private	93rd Regiment of Foot	Indian Mutiny	16 November 1857
Robert Grant	Sergeant	5th Regiment of Foot	Indian Mutiny	24 September 1857
Percival Gratwick	Private	2/48th Battalion, AIF	Second World War	25–26 October 1942*
Robert Gray	Temp. Lieutenant	HMS Formidable	Second World War	9 August 1945*
Thomas Gray	Sergeant	No. 12 Squadron RAF	Second World War	12 May 1940*
John Grayburn	Lieutenant	Parachute Regiment	Second World War	17–20 September 1944*
Fred Greaves	Acting Corporal	Sherwood Foresters	First World War	4 October 1917
John Green	Captain	Royal Army Medical Corps	First World War	1 July 1916*
Patrick Green	Private	75th Regiment of Foot	Indian Mutiny	11 September 1857
Harry Greenwood	Lieutenant Colonel	King's Own (Yorkshire Light Infantry)	First World War	23–24 October 1918
Milton Gregg	Lieutenant	Royal Canadian Regiment	First World War	27 September 1918 to 1 October 1918^{[D]}
William Gregg	Sergeant	Prince Consort's Own (Rifle Brigade)	First World War	6 May 1918
Francis Grenfell	Captain	9th Lancers	First World War	24 August 1914
Julian Gribble	Temp. Captain	Royal Warwickshire Regiment	First World War	23 March 1918
John Grieve	Sergeant Major	Royal Scots Greys	Crimean War	25 October 1854
Robert Grieve	Captain	37th Battalion, AIF	First World War	7 June 1917
William Griffiths	Private	24th Regiment of Foot	Andaman Islands Expedition	7 May 1867
William Grimbaldeston	Acting Company Quartermaster Sergeant	King's Own Scottish Borderers	First World War	16 August 1917
John Grimshaw	Corporal	Lancashire Fusiliers	First World War	25 April 1915
George Gristock	Company Sergeant Major	Royal Norfolk Regiment	Second World War	21 May 1940*^{[C]}
George Grogan	Temp. Brigadier General	Worcestershire Regiment	First World War	27 May 1918
John Guise	Major	90th Regiment of Foot	Indian Mutiny	16 November 1857
George Gunn	Second Lieutenant	3rd Regiment Royal Horse Artillery	Second World War	21 November 1941*
Arthur Gurney	Private	2/48th Battalion, AIF	Second World War	22 July 1942*
Basil Guy	Midshipman	Naval Brigade	Boxer Rising	13 July 1900
Thomas Hackett	Lieutenant	23rd Regiment of Foot	Indian Mutiny	18 November 1857
William Hackett	Sapper	Corps of Royal Engineers	First World War	22–23 June 1916*
Abdul Hafiz	Jemadar	9th Jat Infantry	Second World War	6 April 1944*
Reginald Haine	Second Lieutenant	Honourable Artillery Company	First World War	28–29 April 1917
Thomas Hale	Assistant surgeon	7th Regiment of Foot	Crimean War	8 September 1855
Arthur Hall	Corporal	54th Battalion, AIF	First World War	1 September 1918
Frederick Hall	Company Sergeant Major	8th Battalion, CEF	First World War	23–24 April 1915*
William Hall	Able Seaman	HMS Shannon	Indian Mutiny	16 November 1857
Lewis Halliday	Captain	Royal Marine Light Infantry	Boxer Rising	24 June 1900
Joel Halliwell	Lance Corporal	Lancashire Fusiliers	First World War	27 May 1918
Rupert Hallowes	Temp. Second Lieutenant	Duke of Cambridge's Own (Middlesex Regiment)	First World War	25–30 September 1915*
Albert Halton	Private	King's Own (Royal Lancaster Regiment)	First World War	12 October 1917
John Hamilton	Acting Lance Corporal	Highland Light Infantry	First World War	25–26 September 1917
John Hamilton	Private	3rd Battalion, AIF	First World War	9 August 1915
Thomas Hamilton	Captain	68th Regiment of Foot	Crimean War	11 May 1855
Walter Hamilton	Lieutenant	Corps of Guides	Second Afghan War	2 April 1879*
Arthur Hammond	Captain	Corps of Guides	Second Afghan War	14 December 1879
Harry Hampton	Sergeant	King's (Liverpool) Regiment	Second Boer War	21 August 1900
Thomas Hancock	Private	9th Queen's Royal Lancers	Indian Mutiny	19 June 1857
Robert Hanna	Company Sergeant Major	29th Battalion, CEF	First World War	21 August 1917
John Hannah	Sergeant	No. 83 Squadron RAF	Second World War	15 September 1940
Percy Hansen	Captain	Lincolnshire Regiment	First World War	9 August 1915
Henry Harden	Lance Corporal	Royal Army Medical Corps	Second World War	23 January 1945
William Hardham	Farrier Sergeant Major	4th New Zealand Contingent	Second Boer War	28 January 1901
Israel Harding	Gunner	HMS Alexandra	Occupation of Egypt	11 July 1882
Theodore Hardy	Chaplain	Royal Army Chaplains' Department	First World War	7 July 1918
Hastings Harington	Lieutenant	Bengal Horse Artillery	Indian Mutiny	14–22 November 1857
John Harman	Lance Corporal	Queen's Own Royal West Kent Regiment	Second World War	8–9 April 1944*
John Harper	Corporal	York and Lancaster Regiment	Second World War	29 September 1944*
Thomas Harris	Sergeant	Queen's Own (Royal West Kent Regiment)	First World War	9 August 1918*
Arthur Harrison	Lieutenant Commander	HMS Vindictive	First World War	22–23 April 1918*
John Harrison	Leading Seaman	Naval Brigade	Indian Mutiny	16 November 1857
John Harrison	Second Lieutenant	East Yorkshire Regiment	First World War	3 May 1917*
Reginald Hart	Lieutenant	Royal Engineers	Second Afghan War	31 January 1879
Henry Hartigan	Pensioned Sergeant	9th Queen's Royal Lancers	Indian Mutiny	8 June 1857, 10 October 1857
Edmund Hartley	Surgeon Major	Cape Mounted Riflemen	Basuto War	5 June 1879
Francis Harvey	Major	Royal Marine Light Infantry	First World War	31 May 1916*
Frederick Harvey	Lieutenant	Lord Strathcona's Horse (Royal Canadians)	First World War	27 March 1917
Jack Harvey	Private	London Regiment	First World War	2 September 1918
Norman Harvey	Private	Royal Inniskilling Fusiliers	First World War	25 October 1918
Samuel Harvey	Private	York and Lancaster Regiment	First World War	29 September 1915
Henry Havelock-Allan	Lieutenant	10th Regiment of Foot	Indian Mutiny	16 July 1857
Lanoe Hawker	Captain	No. 6 Squadron RFC	First World War	25 July 1915
David Hawkes	Private	Rifle Brigade	Indian Mutiny	11 March 1858*
Robert Hawthorne	Bugler	52nd Regiment of Foot	Indian Mutiny	14 September 1857
Reginald Hayward	Acting Captain	Duke of Edinburgh's (Wiltshire Regiment)	First World War	21–22 March 1918
Charles Heaphy	Major	Auckland Militia	New Zealand Wars	11 February 1864
Alfred Heathcote	Lieutenant	60th Rifles	Indian Mutiny	June to September 1857^{[D]}
William Heaton	Private	King's (Liverpool) Regiment	Second Boer War	23 August 1900
Michael Heaviside	Private	Durham Light Infantry	First World War	6 May 1917
Frederick Hedges	Temp. Lieutenant	Bedfordshire Regiment	First World War	24 October 1918
Arthur Henderson	Acting Captain	Princess Louises's (Argyll and Sutherland Highlanders)	First World War	23 April 1917*
Edward Henderson	Temp. Lieutenant Colonel	Prince of Wales's (North Staffordshire Regiment)	First World War	25 January 1917*
George Henderson	Captain	Manchester Regiment	Arab Revolt	24 July 1920*
Herbert Henderson	Trooper	Bulawayo Field Force	Matabeleland Rebellion	30 March 1896
Clement Heneage-Walker	Captain	8th King's Royal Irish Hussars	Indian Mutiny	17 June 1858
Andrew Henry	Sergeant	Royal Regiment of Artillery	Crimean War	5 November 1854
Alfred Herring	Temp. Second Lieutenant	Royal Army Service Corps	First World War	23–24 March 1918
William Hewett	Lieutenant	HMS Beagle	Crimean War	26 October 1854
James Hewitson	Lance Corporal	King's Own (Royal Lancaster Regiment)	First World War	26 April 1918
Dennis Hewitt	Second Lieutenant	Hampshire Regiment	First World War	31 July 1917*
William Hewitt	Lance Corporal	2nd South African Light Infantry	First World War	20 September 1917
Alan Hill	Lieutenant	Northamptonshire Regiment	First Boer War	28 January 1881
Albert Hill	Private	Royal Welsh Fusiliers	First World War	20 July 1916
Samuel Hill	Sergeant	90th Regiment of Foot	Indian Mutiny	16 November 1857
James Hills	Second Lieutenant	Bengal Horse Artillery	Indian Mutiny	9 July 1857
George Hinckley	Able Seaman	Naval Brigade	Taiping Rebellion	9 October 1862
Jack Hinton	Sergeant	2nd Division, NZEF	Second World War	29 April 1941
David Hirsch	Acting Captain	Green Howards	First World War	23 April 1917*
Frederick Hitch	Private	24th Regiment of Foot	Anglo-Zulu War	22–23 January 1879
Frederick Hobson	Sergeant	1st Battalion, CEF	First World War	18 August 1917*
Samuel Hodge	Private	West India Regiment	The Gambia	30 June 1866
Charles Hoey	Temp. Major	Lincolnshire Regiment	Second World War	16 February 1944*
John Hogan	Sergeant	Manchester Regiment	First World War	29 October 1914
Norman Holbrook	Lieutenant	HMS B11	First World War	13 December 1914
Edward Holland	Sergeant	Royal Canadian Dragoons	Second Boer War	7 November 1900
John Holland	Lieutenant	Prince of Wales's Leinster Regiment	First World War	3 September 1916
George Hollis	Farrier	8th King's Royal Irish Hussars	Indian Mutiny	17 June 1858
Stanley Hollis	Company Sergeant Major	Green Howards	Second World War	6 June 1944
James Hollowell	Private	78th Regiment of Foot	Indian Mutiny	26 September 1857
Frederick Holmes	Lance Corporal	King's Own (Yorkshire Light Infantry)	First World War	26 August 1914
Joel Holmes	Private	84th Regiment of Foot	Indian Mutiny	25 September 1857
Thomas Holmes	Private	2nd Battalion, CEF	First World War	26 October 1917
William Holmes	Private	Grenadier Guards	First World War	9 October 1918*
Anthony Home	Surgeon	90th Regiment of Foot	Indian Mutiny	26 September 1857
Duncan Home	Lieutenant	Bengal Sappers and Miners	Indian Mutiny	14 September 1857
Samuel Honey	Lieutenant	78th Battalion, CEF	First World War	27 September to 2 October 1918*^{[D]}
Alfred Hook	Private	24th Regiment of Foot	Anglo-Zulu War	22–23 January 1879
William Hope	Lieutenant	7th Regiment of Foot	Crimean War	18 June 1855
Alexander Hore-Rithven	Captain	Highland Light Infantry	Sudan Campaign	22 September 1898
Ernest Horlock	Bombardier	Royal Field Artillery	First World War	15 September 1914
David Hornell	Flight Lieutenant	No. 162 Squadron RCAF	Second World War	24 June 1944*
Basil Horsfall	Second Lieutenant	East Lancashire Regiment	First World War	21 March 1918*
Alec Horwood	Lieutenant	Queen's Royal Regiment (West Surrey)	Second World War	18–20 January 1944*
William House	Private	Royal Berkshire Regiment	Second Boer War	2 August 1900
George Howell	Corporal	1st Battalion, AIF	First World War	6 May 1917
Neville Howse	Captain	New South Wales Army Medical Corps	Second Boer War	24 July 1900
Charles Hudson	Lieutenant Colonel	Sherwood Foresters	First World War	15 June 1918
James Huffam	Second Lieutenant	Duke of Wellington's (West Riding Regiment)	First World War	31 August 1918
Mathew Hughes	Private	7th Regiment of Foot	Crimean War	7 June 1855; 18 June 1855^{[D]}
Thomas Hughes	Private	Connaught Rangers	First World War	3 September 1916
Charles Hull	Private	21st Lancers	First World War	5 September 1915
Alfred Hulme	Sergeant	2nd Division, NZEF	Second World War	20–28 May 1941
Robert Humpston	Private	Rifle Brigade (Prince Consort's Own)	Crimean War	22 April 1855
David Hunter	Corporal	Highland Light Infantry	First World War	16–17 September 1918
Thomas Hunter	Temp. Corporal	43 Commando	Second World War	2 April 1945*
Bellenden Hutcheson	Captain	Royal Canadian Army Medical Corps	First World War	2 September 1918
James Hutchinson	Private	Lancashire Fusiliers	First World War	28 June 1916
Arthur Hutt	Private	Royal Warwickshire Regiment	First World War	4 October 1917
Alfred Ind	Shoeing Smith	Royal Horse Artillery	Second Boer War	20 December 1901
George Ingouville	Captain of the Mast	HMS Arrogant	Crimean War	13 July 1855
George Ingram	Lieutenant	24th Battalion, AIF	First World War	4 October 1918
Edgar Inkson	Lieutenant	Royal Army Medical Corps	Second Boer War	24 February 1900
James Innes	Lieutenant	Bengal Sappers and Miners	Indian Mutiny	23 February 1858
Gilbert Insall	Second Lieutenant	No. 11 Squadron RFC	First World War	7 November 1915
Reginald Inwood	Private	10th Battalion, AIF	First World War	19–22 September 1917
Charles Irwin	Private	53rd Regiment of Foot	Indian Mutiny	16 November 1857
Ishar Singh	Sepoy	28th Punjab Regiment	Waziristan Campaign	10 April 1921
Albert Jacka	Lance Corporal	14th Battalion, AIF	First World War	19–20 May 1915
James Jackman	Temp. Captain	Royal Northumberland Fusiliers	Second World War	25 November 1941*
Harold Jackson	Sergeant	East Yorkshire Regiment	First World War	22 March 1918
Norman Jackson	Sergeant	No. 106 Squadron RAF	Second World War	26 April 1944
Thomas Jackson	Lance Corporal	Coldstream Guards	First World War	27 September 1918*
William Jackson	Private	17th Battalion, AIF	First World War	25 June 1916
Herbert James	Second Lieutenant	Worcestershire Regiment	First World War	28 June 1915
Manley James	Temp. Captain	Gloucestershire Regiment	First World War	21–23 March 1918
David Jamieson	Captain	Royal Norfolk Regiment	Second World War	7–8 August 1944
George Jarratt	Corporal	Royal Fusiliers	First World War	3 May 1917*
Hanson Jarrett	Lieutenant	26th Bengal Native Infantry	Indian Mutiny	14 October 1858
Charles Jarvis	Lance Corporal	Corps of Royal Engineers	First World War	23 August 1914
Joseph Jee	Surgeon	78th Regiment of Foot	Indian Mutiny	25 September 1857
Francis Jefferson	Fusilier	Lancashire Fusiliers	Second World War	16 May 1944
Clarence Jeffries	Captain	34th Battalion, AIF	First World War	12 October 1917*
Edward Jennings	Rough Rider	Bengal Horse Artillery	Indian Mutiny	14–22 November 1857
Jørgen Jensen	Private	50th Battalion, AIF	First World War	2 April 1917
Henry Jerome	Captain	86th Regiment of Foot	Indian Mutiny	3 April 1858
Alan Jerrard	Lieutenant	No. 66 Squadron RFC	First World War	30 March 1918
Dudley Johnson	Acting Lieutenant Colonel	Royal Sussex Regiment	First World War	4 November 1918
Frederick Johnson	Temp. Second Lieutenant	Corps of Royal Engineers	First World War	25 September 1915
James Johnson	Second Lieutenant	Northumberland Fusiliers	First World War	14 October 1918
William Johnson	Sergeant	Sherwood Foresters	First World War	3 October 1918
Robert Johnston	Captain	Imperial Light Horse	Second Boer War	21 October 1899
William Johnston	Captain	Corps of Royal Engineers	First World War	14 September 1914
William Johnstone	Stoker	HMS Arrogant	Crimean War	9 August 1854
Alfred Jones	Lieutenant	9th Queen's Royal Lancers	Indian Mutiny	8 June 1857
David Jones	Sergeant	King's (Liverpool Regiment)	First World War	3 September 1916
Henry Jones	Captain	7th Regiment of Foot	Crimean War	7 June 1855
Herbert Jones	Lieutenant Colonel	Parachute Regiment	Falklands War	28 May 1982*
Loftus Jones	Commander	HMS Shark	First World War	31 May 1916*
Richard Jones	Temp. Lieutenant	Loyal North Lancashire Regiment	First World War	21 May 1916*
Robert Jones	Private	24th Regiment of Foot	Anglo-Zulu War	22–23 January 1879
Thomas Jones	Private	Cheshire Regiment	First World War	25 September 1916
William Jones	Private	24th Regiment of Foot	Anglo-Zulu War	22–23 January 1879
Eustace Jotham	Captain	51st Sikhs	First World War	7 January 1915*
William Joynt	Lieutenant	8th Battalion, AIF	First World War	23 August 1918
Reginald Judson	Sergeant	New Zealand and Australian Division	First World War	26 August 1918
Joseph Kaeble	Corporal	22nd Battalion, CEF	First World War	8 June 1918
Kamal Ram	Sepoy	8th Punjab Regiment	Second World War	12 May 1944
Karamjeet Judge	Lieutenant	15th Punjab Regiment	Second World War	18 March 1945*
Karanbahadur Rana	Rifleman	3rd Queen Alexandra's Own Gurkha Rifles	First World War	10 April 1918
Thomas Kavanagh	Gunner	Bengal Civil Service	Indian Mutiny	9 November 1857
Richard Keatinge	Major	Bombay Artillery	Indian Mutiny	17 March 1858
Joseph Kellaway	Boatswain Third Class	HMS Wrangler	Crimean War	31 August 1855
Richard Kelliher	Private	2/25th Battalion, AIF	Second World War	13 September 1943
Robert Kells	Lance Corporal	9th Queen's Royal Lancers	Indian Mutiny	28 September 1857
Henry Kelly	Temp. Second Lieutenant	Duke of Wellington's (West Riding Regiment)	First World War	4 October 1916
William Kenealy	Private	Lancashire Fusiliers	First World War	25 April 1915
Edward Kenna	Private	2/4th Battalion, AIF	Second World War	15 May 1945
Paul Kenna	Captain	21st Lancers	Sudan Campaign	2 September 1898
John Kenneally	Lance Corporal	Irish Guards	Second World War	28 April 1943
Charles Kennedy	Private	Highland Light Infantry	Second Boer War	22 November 1900
Henry Kenny	Private	Loyal North Lancashire Regiment	First World War	25 September 1915
James Kenny	Private	53rd Regiment of Foot	Indian Mutiny	16 November 1857
Thomas Kenny	Private	Durham Light Infantry	First World War	4 November 1915
Thomas Kenny	Private	2nd Battalion, AIF	First World War	9 April 1917
William Kenny	Drummer	Gordon Highlanders	First World War	23 October 1914
William Kenny	Lieutenant	39th Garhwal Rifles	Waziristan Campaign	2 January 1920*
Allan Ker	Lieutenant	Gordon Highlanders	First World War	21 March 1918
George Kerr	Lieutenant	3rd Battalion, CEF	First World War	27 September 1918
John Kerr	Private	4th Battalion, CEF	First World War	16 September 1916
William Kerr	Lieutenant	24th Bombay Native Infantry	Indian Mutiny	10 July 1857
Geoffrey Keyes	Temp. Lieutenant Colonel	No. 11 (Scottish) Commando	Second World War	17–18 November 1941*
Leonard Keysor	Private	1st Battalion, AIF	First World War	7 August 1915
Leonard Keyworth	Lance Corporal	London Regiment	First World War	25–26 May 1915
Khudadad Khan	Sepoy	129th Duke of Connaught's Own Baluchis	First World War	31 October 1914
William Kibby	Sergeant	2/48th Battalion, AIF	Second World War	23–31 October 1942*
Arthur Kilby	Captain	South Staffordshire Regiment	First World War	25 September 1915*
Bruce Kingsbury	Private	2/14th Battalion, AIF	Second World War	29 August 1942
Cecil Kinross	Private	49th Battalion, CEF	First World War	30 October 1917
Frank Kirby	Corporal	Royal Engineers	Second Boer War	2 June 1900
James Kirk	Second Lieutenant	Manchester Regiment	First World War	4 November 1918*
John Kirk	Private	10th Regiment of Foot	Indian Mutiny	4 June 1857
Alfred Knight	Sergeant	Post Office Rifles	First World War	20 September 1917
Arthur Knight	Acting Sergeant	10th Battalion, CEF	First World War	2 September 1918*
Henry Knight	Corporal	King's (Liverpool) Regiment	Second Boer War	21 August 1900
George Knowland	Lieutenant	No. 1 Commando	Second World War	31 January 1945*
Cecil Knox	Temp. Second Lieutenant	Corps of Royal Engineers	First World War	22 March 1918
John Knox	Sergeant	Scots Fusiliers Guards	Crimean War	20 September 1854
Filip Konowal	Acting Corporal	47th Battalion, CEF	First World War	22–24 August 1917
Kulbir Thapa	Rifleman	3rd Queen Alexandra's Own Gurkha Rifles	First World War	25 September 1915
Lachhiman Gurung	Rifleman	8th Gurkha Rifles	Second World War	12–13 May 1945
Alexander Lafone	Major	1st County of London Yeomanry	First World War	27 October 1917*
Daniel Laidlaw	Piper	King's Own Scottish Borderers	First World War	25 September 1915
Lala	Lance Naik	41st Dogras	First World War	21 January 1916
Lalbahadur Thapa	Subadar	2nd Gurkha Rifles	Second World War	5–6 April 1943
George Lambert	Sergeant Major	84th Regiment of Foot	Indian Mutiny	29 June 1857, 16 August 1857, 25 September 1857
Thomas Lane	Private	67th Regiment of Foot	Third China War	21 August 1860
Arthur Lascelles	Acting Captain	Durham Light Infantry	First World War	3 December 1917
Anders Lassen	Temp. Major	Special Air Service	Second World War	8–9 April 1945*
David Lauder	Private	Royal Scots Fusiliers	First World War	13 August 1915
Thomas Laughnan	Gunner	Bengal Horse Artillery	Indian Mutiny	14 November 1857 to 22 November 1857
Harry Laurent	Sergeant	New Zealand Rifle Brigade	First World War	12 September 1918
Brian Lawrence	Sergeant	17th Lancers	Second Boer War	7 August 1900
Samuel Lawrence	Lieutenant	32nd Regiment of Foot	Indian Mutiny	7 July 1857, 26 September 1857
Edward Lawson	Private	Gordon Highlanders	Tirah Campaign	20 October 1897
Herbert Le Patourel	Temp. Major	Hampshire Regiment	Second World War	3 December 1942
Ferdinand Le Quesne	Surgeon	Royal Army Medical Corps	British rule in Burma	4 May 1889
Edward Leach	Captain	Royal Engineers & Bengal Sappers and Miners	Second Afghan War	17 March 1879
James Leach	Second Lieutenant	Manchester Regiment	First World War	29 October 1914
John Leak	Private	9th Battalion, AIF	First World War	23 July 1916
Joshua Leakey	Lance Corporal	Parachute Regiment	Operation Herrick	22 August 2013
Nigel Leakey	Sergeant	King's African Rifles	Second World War	19 May 1941*
Okill Learmonth	Acting Major	2nd Battalion, CEF	First World War	18 August 1917*
Roderick Learoyd	Flight Lieutenant	No. 49 Squadron RAF	Second World War	12 August 1940
William Leet	Major	13th Regiment of Foot	Indian Mutiny	28 March 1879
Peter Leitch	Colour Sergeant	Corps of Royal Engineers	Crimean War	18 June 1855
James Leith	Lieutenant	14th Light Dragoons	Indian Mutiny	1 April 1858
William Lendrim	Corporal	Corps of Royal Engineers	Crimean War	14 February 1855
Wilbraham Lennox	Lieutenant	Corps of Royal Engineers	Crimean War	20 November 1854
Edmund Lenon	Lieutenant	67th Regiment of Foot	Third China War	21 August 1860
Frank Lester	Corporal	Lancashire Fusiliers	First World War	12 October 1918
Hubert Lewis	Private	Welsh Regiment	First World War	22–23 October 1916*
Leonard Lewis	Lance Corporal	Northamptonshire Regiment	First World War	18–21 September 1918*
Ian Liddell	Temp. Captain	Coldstream Guards	Second World War	3 April 1945
John Liddell	Captain	Princess Louises's (Argyll and Sutherland Highlanders)	First World War	31 July 1915*^{[C]}
Robert Lindsay	Captain	Scots Fusiliers Guards	Crimean War	20 September 1854
John Linton	Commander	HMS Turbulent	Second World War	September 1939 to 23 March 1943*^{[D]}
Joseph Lister	Sergeant	Lancashire Fusiliers	First World War	9 October 1917
Owen Lloyd	Surgeon Major	Royal Army Medical Corps	Kachin Hills Expedition	6 January 1893
Isaac Lodge	Gunner	Royal Horse Artillery	Second Boer War	31 March 1900
Arnold Loosemore	Private	Duke of Wellington's (West Riding Regiment)	First World War	11 August 1917
David Lord	Flight Lieutenant	No. 271 Squadron RAF	Second World War	19 September 1944*
Stewart Loudoun-Shand	Temp. Major	Green Howards	First World War	1 July 1916*
Albert Lowerson	Sergeant	21st Battalion, AIF	First World War	1 September 1918
Charles Lucas	Boatswain's Mate	HMS Hecla	Crimean War	21 June 1854
John Lucas	Colour Sergeant	40th Regiment of Foot	New Zealand Wars	18 March 1861
Frederick Luke	Driver	Royal Field Artillery	First World War	26 August 1914
Charles Lumley	Captain	97th Regiment of Foot	Crimean War	8 September 1855
Frederick Lumsden	Lieutenant	Royal Marine Artillery	First World War	3–4 April 1917
Graham Lyall	Captain	102nd Battalion, CEF	First World War	27 September 1918
Charles Lyell	Captain	Scots Guards	Second World War	22–27 April 1943*
John Lynn	Private	Lancashire Fusiliers	First World War	2 May 1915
John Lyons	Private	19th Regiment of Foot	Crimean War	10 June 1855
Henry Lysons	Lieutenant	26th Regiment of Foot	Anglo-Zulu War	28 March 1879
Harry Lyster	Lieutenant	72nd Bengal Native Infantry	Indian Mutiny	23 May 1858
Henry MacDonald	Colour Sergeant	Corps of Royal Engineers	Crimean War	19 April 1855
Thain MacDowell	Captain	38th Battalion, CEF	First World War	9 April 1917
John MacGregor	Temp. Captain	2nd Canadian Mounted Rifles	First World War	29 September 1918 to 3 October 1918
David MacIntyre	Temp. Lieutenant	Princess Louises's (Argyll and Sutherland Highlanders)	First World War	24 August 1918; 27 August 1918
Donald Macintyre	Major	2nd Gurkha Rifles	Lushai Expedition	4 January 1872
David MacKay	Private	93rd Regiment of Foot	Indian Mutiny	16 November 1857
John MacKay	Lance Corporal	Gordon Highlanders	Second Boer War	20 May 1900
James MacKenzie	Private	Scots Guards	First World War	19 December 1914*
John Mackenzie	Sergeant	Seaforth Highlanders	Third Ashanti Expedition	6 June 1900
John Mackey	Corporal	2/3rd Pioneer Battalion, AIF	Second World War	12 May 1945*
Donald MacKintosh	Lieutenant	Seaforth Highlanders	First World War	11 April 1917*
Hector MacLean	Lieutenant	Corps of Guides	Tirah Campaign	17 August 1897
Herbert Macpherson	Lieutenant	78th Regiment of Foot	Indian Mutiny	25 September 1857
Robert MacTier	Private	23rd Battalion, AIF	First World War	1 September 1918*
Ambrose Madden	Sergeant Major	41st Regiment of Foot	Crimean War	26 October 1854
James Magennis	Acting Leading Seaman	HMS XE3	Second World War	31 July 1945
Michael Magner	Drummer	33rd Regiment of Foot	Abyssinian War	13 April 1868
Patrick Mahoney	Sergeant	1st Madras European Fusiliers	Indian Mutiny	21 September 1857
John Mahony	Major	Westminster Regiment	Second World War	24 May 1944
William Maillard	Surgeon	HMS Hazard	Occupation of Crete	6 September 1898
Hugh Malcolm	Wing Commander	No. 18 Squadron RAF	Second World War	4 December 1942*
John Malcolmson	Lieutenant	3rd Bombay Light Cavalry	Anglo-Persian War	8 February 1857
George Maling	Lieutenant	Royal Army Medical Corps	First World War	25 September 1915
Wilfred Malleson	Midshipman	HMS River Clyde	First World War	25 April 1915
Joseph Malone	Lance-Sergeant	13th Light Dragoons	Crimean War	25 October 1854
Ross Mangles	Civilian	Bengal Civil Service	Indian Mutiny	30 July 1857
William Manley	Assistant surgeon	Royal Artillery	New Zealand Wars	29 April 1864
Edward Mannock	Major	No. 85 Squadron RFC	First World War	17 June 1918 to 26 July 1918*
Conwyn Mansel-Jones	Captain	West Yorkshire Regiment	Second Boer War	27 February 1900
Leslie Manser	Flying Officer	No. 50 Squadron RAF	Second World War	30 May 1942*
Jack Mantle	Acting Leading Seaman	HMS Foylebank	Second World War	4 July 1940*
William Mariner	Private	King's Royal Rifle Corps	First World War	22 May 1915
Percival Marling	Lieutenant	King's Royal Rifle Corps	Sudan Campaign	13 March 1884
James Marshall	Acting Lieutenant Colonel	Irish Guards	First World War	4 November 1918*
William Marshall	Quartermaster Sergeant	19th Hussars	Sudan Campaign	29 February 1884
Cyril Martin	Lieutenant	Corps of Royal Engineers	First World War	12 March 1915
Horace Martineau	Sergeant	Protectorate Regiment	Second Boer War	26 December 1899
Arthur Martin-Leake^{[B]}	Surgeon Captain; Lieutenant	South African Constabulary; Royal Army Medical Corps	Second Boer War; First World War	8 February 1902; 29 October 1914 to 8 November 1914^{[D]}
Richard Masters	Private	Royal Army Service Corps	First World War	9 April 1918
James Masterson	Lieutenant	Devonshire Regiment	Second Boer War	6 January 1900
Francis Maude	Captain	Royal Regiment of Artillery	Indian Mutiny	25 September 1857
Frederick Maude	Brevet Lieutenant Colonel	3rd Regiment of Foot	Crimean War	5 September 1855
Thomas Maufe	Second Lieutenant	Royal Garrison Artillery	First World War	4 June 1917
Francis Maxwell	Lieutenant	Robert's Light Horse	Second Boer War	31 March 1900
Joseph Maxwell	Lieutenant	18th Battalion, AIF	First World War	3 October 1918
Henry May	Private	Cameronians (Scottish Rifles)	First World War	22 October 1914
Leslie Maygar	Lieutenant	5th Victorian Mounted Rifles	Second Boer War	23 November 1901
Arthur Mayo	Midshipman	Indian Naval Brigade	Indian Mutiny	22 November 1857
Tom Mayson	Lance-Sergeant	King's Own (Royal Lancaster Regiment)	First World War	31 July 1917
John McAulay	Corporal	Scots Guards	First World War	27 November 1917
William McBean	Lieutenant	93rd Regiment of Foot	Indian Mutiny	11 March 1858
Robert McBeath	Lance Corporal	Seaforth Highlanders	First World War	20 November 1917
Lawrence McCarthy	Lieutenant	16th Battalion, AIF	First World War	23 August 1918
Charles McCorrie	Private	57th Regiment of Foot	Crimean War	23 June 1855
John McCrea	Surgeon	1st Cape Mounted Yeomanry	Basuto War	14 January 1881
James McCudden	Temp. Captain	No. 56 Squadron RFC	First World War	August 1917 to March 1918
John McDermond	Private	47th Regiment of Foot	Crimean War	5 November 1854
William McDonell	Civilian	Bengal Civil Service	Indian Mutiny	30 July 1857
John McDougall	Private	44th Regiment of Foot	Third China War	21 August 1860
Stanley McDougall	Sergeant	47th Battalion, AIF	First World War	28 March 1918
William McFadzean	Private	Royal Irish Rifles	First World War	1 July 1916*
Samuel McGaw	Lance-Sergeant	42nd Regiment of Foot	First Ashanti Expedition	21 January 1874
Lewis McGee	Sergeant	40th Battalion, AIF	First World War	4 October 1917
John McGovern	Private	1st Bengal European Fusiliers	Indian Mutiny	23 June 1857
David McGregor	Lieutenant	Royal Scots (Lothian Regiment)	First World War	22 October 1918
Roderick McGregor	Private	Rifle Brigade (Prince Consort's Own)	Crimean War	July 1855
Louis McGuffie	Acting Sergeant	King's Own Scottish Borderers	First World War	28 September 1918*
James McGuire	Sergeant	1st Bengal European Fusiliers	Indian Mutiny	14 September 1857
Patrick McHale	Private	5th Regiment of Foot	Indian Mutiny	2 October 1857, 22 December 1857
Hugh McInnes	Gunner	Bengal Artillery	Indian Mutiny	14 November 1857 to 22 November 1857
George McIntosh	Private	Gordon Highlanders	First World War	31 July 1917
Hugh McIver	Private	Royal Scots (Lothian Regiment)	First World War	23 August 1918
Ian McKay	Sergeant	Parachute Regiment	Falklands War	12 June 1982*
George McKean	Lieutenant	14th Battalion, CEF	First World War	27–28 April 1918
James McKechnie	Sergeant	Scots Fusilier Guards	Crimean War	20 September 1854
Edward McKenna	Colour Sergeant	65th Regiment of Foot	New Zealand Wars	7 September 1863
Albert McKenzie	Able Seaman	HMS Vindictive	First World War	22–23 April 1918
Hugh McKenzie	Lieutenant	Canadian Machine Gun Corps	First World War	30 October 1917*
Alan McLeod	Second Lieutenant	No. 2 Squadron RFC	First World War	27 March 1918
Peter McManus	Private	5th Regiment of Foot	Indian Mutiny	26 September 1857
Valentine McMaster	Assistant surgeon	78th Regiment of Foot	Indian Mutiny	25 September 1857
Eric McNair	Temp. Lieutenant	Royal Sussex Regiment	First World War	14 February 1916
William McNally	Sergeant	Green Howards	First World War	27 October 1918
Frank McNamara	Lieutenant	No. 1 Squadron AFC	First World War	20 March 1917
John McNamara	Corporal	East Surrey Regiment	First World War	3 September 1918
John McNeill	Lieutenant Colonel	107th Bengal Infantry Regiment	New Zealand Wars	30 March 1864
Frederick McNess	Lance-Sergeant	Scots Guards	First World War	15 September 1916
Stewart McPherson	Colour Sergeant	78th Regiment of Foot	Indian Mutiny	26 September 1857
James McPhie	Corporal	Corps of Royal Engineers	First World War	14 October 1918*
Bernard McQuirt	Private	95th Regiment of Foot	Indian Mutiny	6 January 1858
Allastair McReady-Diarmid	Acting Captain	Duke of Cambridge's Own (Middlesex Regiment)	First World War	30 November 1917 to 1 December 1917*
William McWheeney	Sergeant	44th Regiment of Foot	Crimean War	20 October 1854
Samuel Meekosha	Corporal	Prince of Wales's Own (West Yorkshire Regiment)	First World War	19 November 1915
John Meikle	Sergeant	Seaforth Highlanders	First World War	20 July 1918
Maury Meiklejohn	Captain	Gordon Highlanders	Second Boer War	21 October 1899
Edward Mellish	Chaplain	Royal Army Chaplains' Department	First World War	27–29 March 1916
Charles Melliss	Captain	Indian Staff Corps	Third Ashanti Expedition	30 September 1900
Teignmouth Melvill	Lieutenant	24th Regiment of Foot	Anglo-Zulu War	22 January 1879*
Charles Melvin	Private	Black Watch (Royal Highlanders)	First World War	21 April 1917
William Merrifield	Sergeant	4th Battalion, CEF	First World War	1 October 1918
Charles Merritt	Major	South Saskatchewan Regiment	Second World War	19 August 1942
William Metcalf	Lance Corporal	16th Battalion, CEF	First World War	2 September 1918
Godfrey Meynell	Captain	12th Frontier Force Regiment	Second Mohmand Campaign	29 September 1935*
Ron Middleton	Flight Sergeant	No. 149 Squadron RAF	Second World War	28 November 1942*
Anthony Miers	Commander	HMS Torbay	Second World War	4–5 March 1942
John Milbanke	Lieutenant	10th Hussars	Second Boer War	5 January 1900
Francis Miles	Private	Gloucestershire Regiment	First World War	23 October 1918
Duncan Millar	Private	42nd Regiment of Foot	Indian Mutiny	15 January 1859
Frederick Miller	Lieutenant	Royal Regiment of Artillery	Crimean War	5 November 1854
James Miller	Private	Bengal Ordnance Depot	Indian Mutiny	28 October 1857
James Miller	Conductor	King's Own (Royal Lancaster Regiment)	First World War	30–31 July 1916*
Walter Mills	Private	Manchester Regiment	First World War	10–11 December 1917*
William Milne	Private	16th Battalion, CEF	First World War	9 April 1917*
Harry Miner	Corporal	58th Battalion, CEF	First World War	8 August 1918*
Mir Dast	Jemadar	55th Coke's Rifles (Frontier Force)	First World War	26 April 1915
Coulson Norman Mitchell	Captain	4th Canadian Engineers	First World War	8–9 October 1918
George Mitchell	Private	Gordon Highlanders	Second World War	23–24 January 1944*
Samuel Mitchell	Captain of the Foretop	HMS Harrier	New Zealand Wars	29 April 1864
Martin Moffat	Private	Prince of Wales's Leinster Regiment	First World War	14 October 1918
John Molyneux	Sergeant	Royal Fusiliers	First World War	9 October 1917
Thomas Monaghan	Trumpeter	2nd Dragoon Guards	Indian Mutiny	8 October 1858
George Monger	Private	23rd Regiment of Foot	Indian Mutiny	18 November 1857
Rupert Moon	Lieutenant	58th Battalion, AIF	First World War	12 May 1917
George Moor	Second Lieutenant	Hampshire Regiment	First World War	5 June 1915
Arthur Moore	Lieutenant	3rd Bombay Light Cavalry	Anglo-Persian War	8 February 1857
Hans Moore	Major	88th Regiment of Foot	9th Cape Frontier War	29 December 1877
Montague Moore	Second Lieutenant	Hampshire Regiment	First World War	20 September 1917
Samuel Morley	Private	Military Train	Indian Mutiny	15 April 1858
Robert Morrow	Private	Royal Irish Fusiliers (Princess Victoria's)	First World War	12 April 1915
Edward Mott	Sergeant	Border Regiment	First World War	27 January 1917
Thomas Mottershead	Sergeant	No. 20 Squadron RFC	First World War	7 January 1917*
James Mouat	Sergeant	6th Dragoons	Crimean War	26 October 1854
Albert Mountain	Sergeant	Prince of Wales's Own (West Yorkshire Regiment)	First World War	26 March 1918
John Moyney	Lance-Sergeant	Irish Guards	First World War	12–13 September 1917
Andrew Moynihan	Sergeant	90th Regiment of Foot	Crimean War	8 September 1855
Harold Mugford	Lance Corporal	Machine Gun Corps	First World War	11 April 1917
Kenneth Muir	Major	Argyll and Sutherland Highlanders	Korean War	23 September 1950*
Patrick Mullane	Sergeant	Royal Horse Artillery	Second Afghan War	27 July 1880
George Mullin	Sergeant	Princess Patricia's Canadian Light Infantry	First World War	30 October 1917
Charles Mullins	Captain	Imperial Light Horse	Second Boer War	21 October 1899
James Munro	Colour Sergeant	93rd Regiment of Foot	Indian Mutiny	16 November 1857
Michael Murphy	Farrier	Military Train	Indian Mutiny	15 April 1858
Thomas Murphy	Private	24th Regiment of Foot	Andaman Islands Expedition	7 May 1867
Harry Murray	Captain	13th Battalion, AIF	First World War	4–5 February 1917
James Murray	Lance Corporal	Connaught Rangers	First Boer War	16 January 1881
John Murray	Sergeant	68th Regiment of Foot	New Zealand Wars	21 June 1864
Edgar Myles	Lieutenant	Welsh Regiment	First World War	9 April 1916
Patrick Mylott	Private	84th Regiment of Foot	Indian Mutiny	12 July 1857 to 25 September 1857
Andrew Mynarski	Pilot Officer	No. 419 Squadron RCAF	Second World War	12 June 1944*

== Notes ==
- A Gibson was awarded the Victoria Cross primarily for Operation Chastise (the Dambusters raid), but also for leadership and valour demonstrated as master bomber on many previous sorties.
- B This was a Bar to the Victoria Cross
- C Recipient died of their wounds
- D Recipient awarded the Victoria Cross for multiple acts of valour or for an extended period of sustained courage and outstanding leadership, rather than a single act of valour.
