= John Simpson Knox =

Scottish Victoria Cross recipient (1828–1897)

John Simpson Knox VC
- Born: 30 September 1828; Glasgow, Scotland
- Died: 8 January 1897 (aged 68); Cheltenham, Gloucestershire, England
- Burial place: Cheltenham Cemetery
- Military career
- Allegiance: United Kingdom
- Branch: British Army
- Service years: c. 1842–1872
- Rank: Major
- Units: Scots Fusilier Guards; 93rd Regiment of Foot; Rifle Brigade
- Conflicts: Crimean War
- Awards: Victoria Cross; Legion d'Honneur (France)

Major John Simpson Knox VC (30 September 1828 – 8 January 1897) was a Scottish recipient of the Victoria Cross, the highest and most prestigious award for gallantry in the face of the enemy that can be awarded to British and Commonwealth forces.

== Early life and military career ==
Born in Glasgow on 30 September 1828, Knox joined the British Army at the age of 14. He was under-age, but was unusually tall, he was promoted to corporal before reaching the age of 18.

== Crimean War ==
By the time of the Crimean War he was serjeant in the Scots Fusilier Guards (now called simply the Scots Guards). The British and French forces began to land on the Crimean Peninsula on 14 September 1854. On 19 September the combined forces moved off toward Sebastopol and on 20 September came the first major engagement of the campaign, the Battle of the Alma.

The Scots Fusilier Guards were part of the 1st Division, brigaded with 3rd Battalion, Grenadier Guards and 1st Battalion, Coldstream Guards, the division's other brigade was the Highland Brigade. The division was at the extreme left of the Allied line (furthest inland), and initially in reserve to the Light Division. The two divisions halted a short distance before the Alma River, the Russians having taken up defensive positions just the other side of river. Here, on the further side of the river the British troops faced first fording the river itself, climbing the bank on its far side, then after a small amount of level ground, a further relatively low, but steep bank, and then a gradual upward slope, at the top of which the Russians had built an earthworks armed with artillery. The British contingents were ordered forward at about 14:45, the French having managed to force a crossing further downstream, near the river's mouth. The Light Division crossed first, but were thrown into confusion by the Russian artillery, and began to withdraw. The Guards' Brigade was ordered forward, and crossed the river. The battalions began re-establishing their ranks on the other side having scrambled up both of the banks on that side of the river. The brigadier ordered them forward without delay, and the Scots, in the middle of the Guards' line obeyed. They began their advance, but the retreating troops of the Light Division broke their line, and some of the Scots Guards joined the retreat. Officers and others, prominent among them Knox, regained control, and rallied much of the battalion. It was this action which was the first of those for which he was eventually awarded the VC. Four other Scots Guards were also to be awarded the VC for their actions that day. In a letter to his family, he described the battle:

The scene that met my gaze was the most awful description: it made me shudder. The bodies of our opponents were so thick on the ground that for some distance I had to go on tiptoe to pass without touching … the enemy cheered, and endeavoured to drive us back; however, we stuck to them until we were masters.

He was commissioned (without purchase) into the 93rd Regiment of Foot as an ensign on 27 February 1855. On 20 April 1855 he was transferred to the Rifle Brigade (Prince Consort's Own) as a lieutenant, and his original commission was backdated to 5 November 1854.

On 18 June 1855, Knox volunteered for the ladder party in the attack on the Redan, an attempt to finish the Siege of Sevastopol, he was struck by a Russian cannonball, removing part of his left arm. His actions that day also contributed toward his receiving the VC. His Crimea Medal shows that he also fought at the Battle of Balaclava and the Battle of Inkerman.

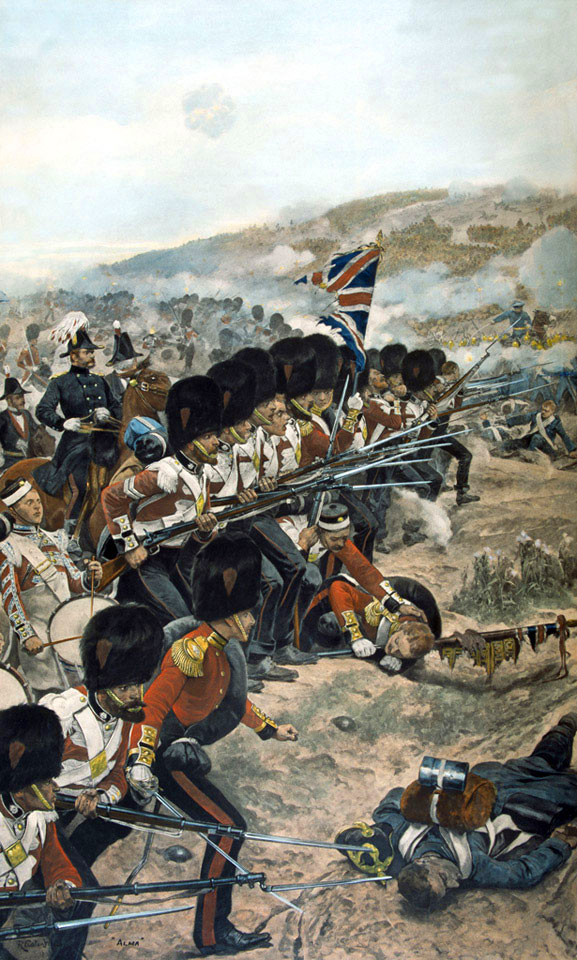
The Storming of the Great Redoubt at the Alma by R. C. Woodville

On 29 January 1856 Queen Victoria signed the warrant creating the Victoria Cross with the intention of rewarding acts of valour in the Crimean War. Knox's VC was one of the first 85 VCs gazetted on 24 February 1857, by which time he had already been made a Chevalier of the Légion d'honneur gazetted on 16 June 1856. His VC citation read:

War Office, 24th February, 1857.

THE Queen has been graciously pleased to signify Her intention to confer the Decoration of the Victoria Cross on the undermentioned Officers and Men of Her Majesty's Navy and Marines, and Officers, Non-commissioned Officers, and Men of Her Majesty's Army, who have been recommended to Her Majesty for that Decoration,—in accordance with the rules laid down in Her Majesty's Warrant of the 29th of January, 1856—on account of acts of bravery performed by them before the Enemy during the late War, as recorded against their several names, viz. :—

[...]

2nd Bat. Rifle Brigade Lieutenant John Knox

When serving as a Serjeant in the Scots Fusilier Guards, Lieutenant Knox was conspicuous for his exertions in reforming the ranks of the Guards at the Battle of the Alma.

Subsequently, when in the Rifle Brigade, he volunteered for the ladder-party in the attack on the Redan, on 18 June, and (in the words of Captain Blackett, under whose command he was) behaved admirably, remaining on the field until twice wounded.

He was among the 62 men at the first presentation of the VC, made by Queen Victoria in Hyde Park, London on 26 June 1857. His action at the Alma was the earliest for which a VC was awarded to a member of the British Army—earlier actions leading to the award of a VC were carried out by members of the Royal Navy.

== Later life ==
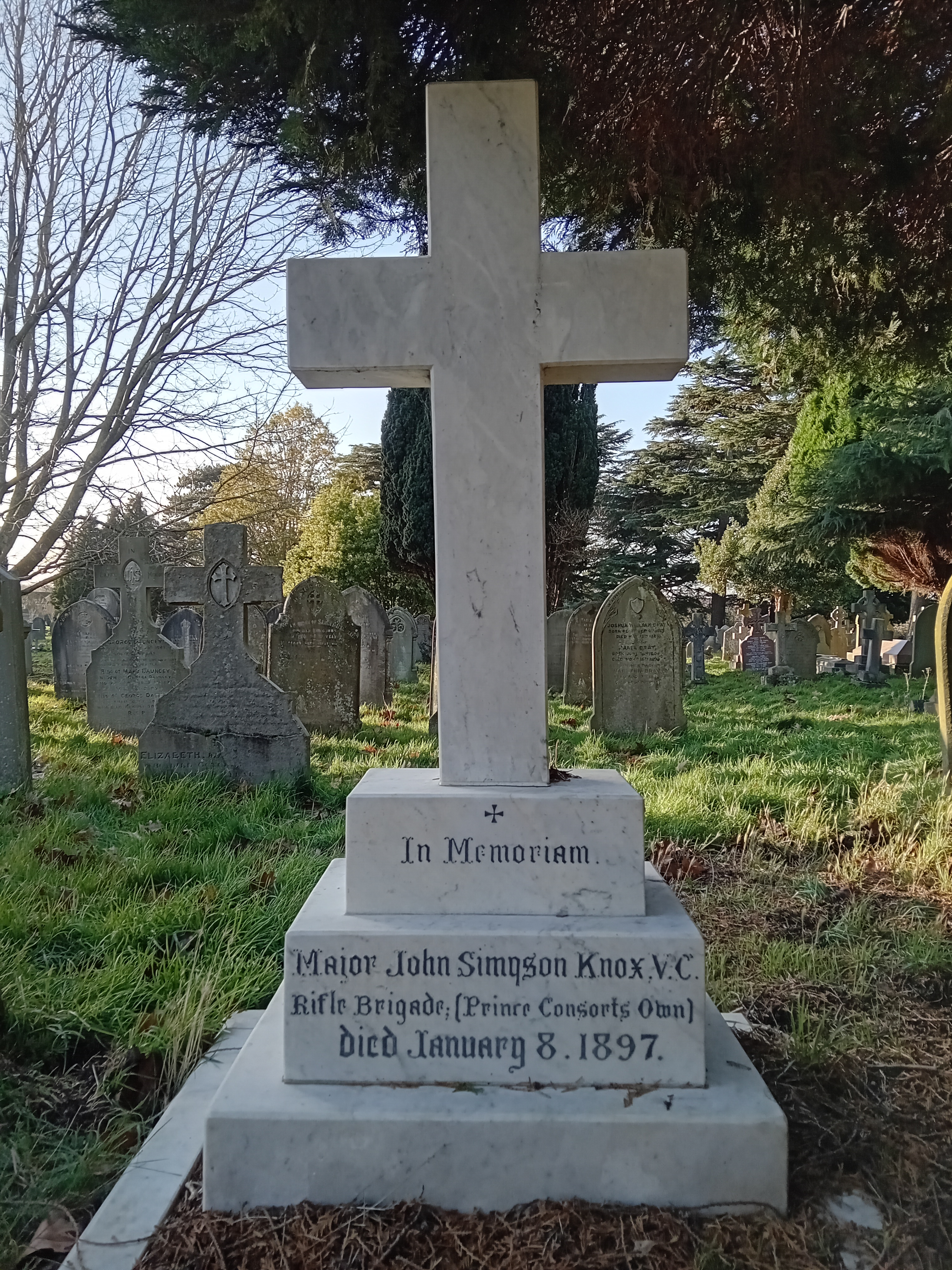
Knox's grave in Cheltenham Cemetery

Despite the loss of his arm, he continued to serve, and was appointed an Instructor of Musketry on 7 January 1858, and promoted captain on 30 April. On 15 June 1866 he was appointed Inspector of Musketry for the South Western District. He briefly returned to regimental duties from 22 January 1872, and on his retirement from the army on 8 June 1872 was granted a brevet majority. He took up residence at Cheltenham where he died on 8 January 1897, and was buried in the town's cemetery where three other VC recipients also lie.

== Sale of medals ==
In March 2010 it was announced that his VC is to be sold at auction in May by medal and coin specialists Spink's, with an estimated price of £100,000–120,000. His VC was sold along with his Crimean War campaign medals, insignia of the Légion d'honneur, and the Russian cannonball which caused the partial loss of his left arm at the Redan. No details of the current owner have been given. The sale took place on 22 April 2010 with the medal and the cannonball being sold for £252,000 ($387,500) to an anonymous buyer.

== Sources ==
- Small, Hugh (2007). The Crimean War—Queen Victoria's War with the Russian Tsar. Chalford: Tempus Publishing. ISBN 978-0-7524-4388-1.
