= John Dunlay =

Irish recipient of the Victoria Cross (1831–1890)

John Dunlea
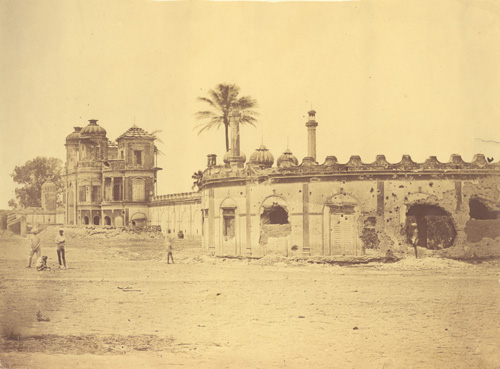
- Secundra Bagh showing the first breach of the walls
- Born: 1831; Douglas, County Cork
- Died: 17 October 1890 (aged 58–59); Cork
- Burial place: St Joseph's Cemetery, Cork
- Military career
- Allegiance: United Kingdom
- Branch: British Army
- Rank: Private
- Units: 93rd Regiment of Foot
- Conflicts: Indian Mutiny
- Awards: Victoria Cross

John Dunlay VC (1831 – 17 October 1890), also known as John Dunley or John Dunlea, was an Irish recipient of the Victoria Cross, the highest and most prestigious award for gallantry in the face of the enemy that can be awarded to British and Commonwealth forces.

He was approximately 26 years old and a lance corporal in the 93rd Regiment of Foot (later the Argyll and Sutherland Highlanders), British Army, during the Indian Mutiny when the following deed took place on 16 November 1857 at Lucknow, India, for which he was awarded the VC:

Lance-Corporal J. Dunlay. Date of Act of Bravery, 16th November, 1857

For being the first man, now surviving, of the Regiment, who, on the 16th November, 1857 entered one of the breaches in the Secundra Bagh, at Lucknow, with Captain Burroughs, whom he most gallantly supported against superior numbers.

Elected by the private soldiers of the Regiment.

Secundra Bagh is a villa and country estate on the outskirts of Lucknow, India.

Dunlea was born in Douglas, County Cork, and died in the South Infirmary, Cork, on 17 October 1890.
