= George Stewart (VC) =

Recipient of the Victoria Cross

- The Charge of the 93rd Highlanders, November 1857 by William Skeoch Cumming
- Born: February 1831; Grandtully, Perthshire
- Died: 26 October 1868 (aged 37); Hythe, Hampshire
- Burial place: St Mary's Church, Grandtully
- Military career
- Allegiance: United Kingdom
- Branch: British Army
- Service years: 1847–1860
- Rank: Major
- Unit: 93rd (Sutherland) Highlanders
- Conflicts: Crimean War: Battle of Alma; Battle of Balaklava; Siege of Sevastopol; Indian Mutiny: Siege of Lucknow
- Awards: Victoria Cross; Order of the Medjidie (Ottoman Empire)

William George Drummond Stewart, VC (February 1831 – 19 October 1868) was a British Army officer and a recipient of the Victoria Cross, the highest award for gallantry in the face of the enemy that can be awarded to British and Commonwealth forces.

== Crimean War ==
George (as he was known) Stewart was the son of Captain Sir William Drummond Stewart, 19th Laird of Grantully and 7th Baronet of Murthly, and his wife Maria Christina (née Battersby). He was born in February 1831 at Grandtully Castle near Pitlochry in Perthshire.

He entered the Army on 2 June 1847 as an ensign in the 93rd Sutherland Highlanders. After four years home service, he attained his promotion as lieutenant, becoming a captain two years later on 29 December 1854. In February 1854, on the outbreak of war with Russia, the 93rd Highlanders embarked for the Crimea, where they were destined to see much fighting and to win great renown.

Stewart was present at the Battle of Alma on 20 September that year, when the 93rd, as part of the Highland Brigade, 1st Division, stormed the Great Russian Battery on the Alma Heights with the other Highland Regiments and Foot Guards (93rd losses: 1 officer, 54 men). He was also present at the Battle of Balaklava a month later on 25 October, where the 93rd alone formed the now famous 'Thin Red Line' which, unsupported, repulsed the charge of a large body of the enemy's cavalry, and thereby prevented a direct assault on the port of Balaklava. He also served in the Siege of Sevastopol through the winter of 1854/5. He was wounded in the trenches above the besieged port, and remained in the Crimea until July 1856, when his regiment returned to England.

For his services in the Campaign, Stewart received the Crimean Medal with clasp for Alma, Balaclava and Sebastopol, the Turkish Medal and the Order of the Medjidie (5th class).

== Indian Mutiny ==
The following summer found the 93rd on its way to India, where the laurels gained in the Crimea were to be more than doubled. The regiment reached Calcutta in September 1857, just in time to join Sir Colin Campbell's advance to relieve the Siege of Lucknow. The heroic achievements of Sir Colin's few forces are now matters of history, foremost among them stand the operations of 16 November: the Capture of the Secunderabagh and the Shah Najaf, deeds with which the name of the 93rd will ever be associated. The first VC exploit of that day was undertaken by Captain George Stewart, whose action was witnessed by Surgeon William Munro of the 93rd Highlanders.

While the artillery was being brought to bear on the Sikandarabagh, Capt. Stewart, with some Highlanders and a few of the 53rd Regiment of Foot, advanced towards two of the enemy's guns, which were maintaining a heavy flanking fire and which covered the approach to the barracks, a large cross-shaped building surrounded by outhouses. Stewart captured the guns in a most gallant manner, and by this means his force was able to gain possession of the barracks . Field Marshal The Lord Roberts described the action as "serviceable as it was heroic, for it silenced the fire most destructive to the attacking force". The possession of this building secured the left of the British advance, and greatly facilitated the ultimate withdrawal of the garrison of Lucknow.

Stewart, perceiving the annoyance which these two guns were causing, and the injury that they might still cause, called upon his company (No.2), and at the head of it, increased in weight and numbers by a few men of the other companies, and of the 53rd, who had joined our men, dashed forward in the most gallant style, captured the guns at the point of the bayonet, turned the guns on the flying rebels, and then, pushing forward at the double, while Captain Cornwall, with his company (No.3) and the men of other companies, followed in support, assaulted the large pile of building called the barracks, situated in the left front of the Sikanderbagh, drove the enemy out, and established themselves in it.

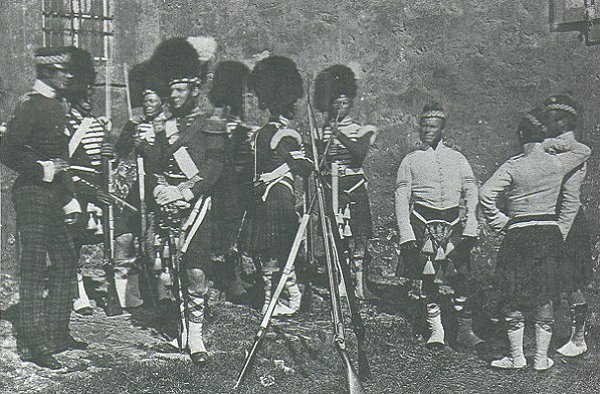
An early photograph by Robertson of officers and men of the 93rd Highland Regiment in the Crimea, 1854

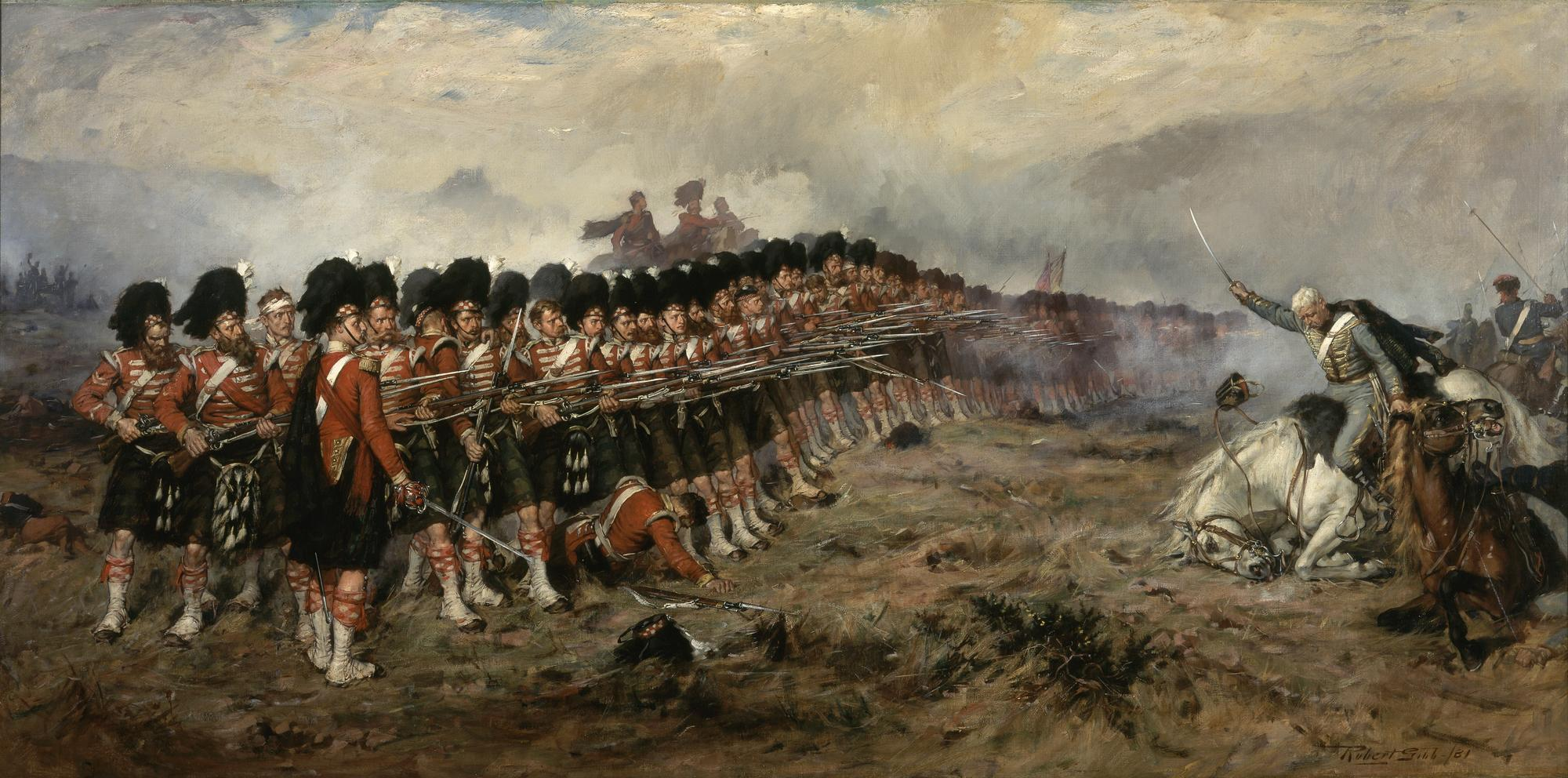
The 93rd Highlanders form the immortalised 'Thin Red Line' to repulse Russian Cavalry at the Battle of Balaklava, Crimea 25 Oct 1854, action in which Capt. Stewart was involved, painted by Robert Gibb

The 93rd Highlanders entering the Secunderabagh, Lucknow through a breach in the wall, 16 Nov 1857 during the Indian Mutiny

Stewart was 26 years old, and a captain in the 93rd (Sutherland) Highlanders when he was awarded the Victoria Cross for his above actions at Lucknow. He was gazetted on 24 December 1858 and his citation read:

For distinguished personal gallantry at Lucknow, on the 16th November, 1857, in leading an attack upon and capturing two guns, by which the position of the mess house was secured. Elected by the Officers of the Regiment.

Six Victoria Crosses in all were bestowed on the 93rd Highlanders for their gallantry on 16 November, but Sir Colin Campbell decided, perhaps fearing that he might be accused of partiality, that only one of these should be given to the officers. Votes were taken and Capt. Stewart was chosen by his brother officers to receive the much prized honour. A total of 18 Victoria Crosses were awarded to British forces at Lucknow on 16 November 1857, the largest number ever awarded in a single day.

After the withdrawal of the Lucknow garrison, Sir Colin's Army was hurried back to Cawnpore. Stewart took part in the great battle which ensued there on 6 December. His regiment was in the thick of the fighting, and two days later, it formed part of the force under Sir Hope Grant. It completed the destruction of the Gwalior rebels as they were attempting to cross the Ganges at Oude. After two months of minor operations, the 93rd fought its way in to Lucknow under Sir Colin Campbell, and distinguished itself as on the previous occasion. Stewart took part in the storming of the Mogum's Palace on 11 March 1858, and, with characteristic daring, led a small party beyond the building in pursuit of the mutineers.

With Lucknow captured, the 93rd was sent into Rohilkand under Brigadier-General Walpole, helped to defeat the enemy at Alaganj, and fought under Sir Colin Campbell at Bareilly. There the regiment remained throughout the hot weather. In the following winter, it took part in the pacification of Oude, which was finally accomplished by the beginning of 1859.

For his services in this campaign, besides the Victoria Cross, Capt. Stewart received the mutiny medal with clasp for Lucknow.

William Stewart was promoted major but left the Army in 1860. On 19 October 1868, while at Hythe, Hampshire, Stewart was giving a demonstration of sword swallowing. His trick went fatally wrong and he died from internal injuries a week later, on 26 October. William Stewart predeceased his father.

== See also ==
- List of Indian Mutiny Victoria Cross recipients
- List of Victoria Cross recipients (N–Z)
- List of Scottish Victoria Cross recipients

== Bibliography ==
- The Journal of the Victoria Cross Society, 150th Indian Mutiny Anniversary Edition, Oct 2007.
- Monuments to Courage (David Harvey, 1999)
- The Register of the Victoria Cross (This England, 1997)
- Scotland's Forgotten Valour (Graham Ross, 1995)
- Military History of Perthshire (edited by the Duchess of Athol).
- Historical Records of the 93rd Sutherland Highlanders (compiled and edited by Roderick Hamilton Burgoyne, late 93rd Highlanders. London, 1883)
- An Reisimeid Chataich, The 93rd Sutherland Highlanders (Brig. Gen. A.E.J. Cavendish, CMG. 1928)
- History of the 93rd Sutherland Highlanders 1800–1895 (Lt.Col. Percy Groves, R.G.A. W & AK Johnston, Edinburgh & London, 1895)
- Records of Service and Campaigning in Many Lands (Surgeon-General Munro, MD, CB., late of 93rd Highlanders. London. 1887)
- Reminiscences of Military Service with the 93rd Sutherland Highlanders (Surgeon-General Munro, MD, CB., formerly surgeon of the regiment. London. 1883)
- Reminiscences of the Great Mutiny 1857–59 (Wm. Forbes-Mitchell, late sergeant 93rd Highlanders. London. 1895)
- Recollections of A Highland Subaltern (Lt. Col. W. Gordon-Alexander, late 93rd Highlanders. London. 1898)
- Fighting Highlanders! The History of The Argyll & Sutherland Highlanders (Major P.J.R. Mileham. London. 1993)
- Famous Regiments, The Argyll and Sutherland Highlanders (by Douglas Sutherland, M.C. London. 1969)
- The Scottish Regiments 1633–1987 (Maj. P.J.R. Mileham. 1988)
- The Scottish Soldier (Stephen Wood. Manchester. 1987)
- Soldiers of Scotland (Lt. Col. John Baynes Bt, MSc 1988)
- The Highland Brigade in the Crimea (founded on letters written during the years 1854, 1855 & 1856, by Lt. Col. Anthony Sterling, "a staff officer who was there")
- Argyll and Sutherland Highlanders (Wm. McElwee and Michael Roffe. Osprey. 1972)
