= Peter Grant (VC) =

Recipient of the Victoria Cross

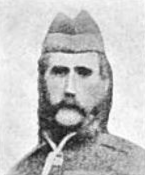
- Born: 1824; Ireland
- Died: 10 January 1868 (aged 43–44); Dundee, Scotland
- Burial place: Eastern Necropolis, Dundee
- Military career
- Allegiance: United Kingdom
- Branch: British Army
- Rank: Private
- Units: 93rd Regiment of Foot
- Conflicts: Crimean War; Indian Mutiny
- Awards: Victoria Cross

Peter Grant VC (1824 – 10 January 1868) was a British Army soldier and an Irish recipient of the Victoria Cross, the highest award for gallantry in the face of the enemy that can be awarded to British and Commonwealth forces.

== Victoria Cross action ==
Grant was about 33 years old, and a private in the 93rd Regiment of Foot (later The Argyll and Sutherland Highlanders (Princess Louise's)) during the Indian Mutiny when the following deed took place on 16 November 1857 at the Secundra Bagh, Lucknow, for which he was awarded the VC:

93rd Regiment, Private P. Grant

Date of Act of Bravery, 16th November, 1857

For great personal gallantry, on the 16th of November, 1857, at the Secundra Bagh, in killing five of the enemy with one of their own swords, who were attempting to follow Lieutenant-Colonel Ewart, when that officer was carrying away a colour which he had captured. Elected by the private soldiers of the Regiment.

He died from drowning in the River Tay in Dundee, Scotland on 10 January 1868.
