= William McBean =

Scottish recipient of the Victoria Cross

Major-General William McBean VC
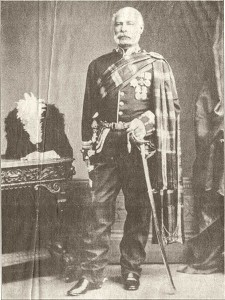
- Born: 1 January 1819; Inverness, Scotland
- Died: 22 June 1878 (aged 59); London, England
- Burial place: Grange Cemetery, Edinburgh
- Military career
- Allegiance: United Kingdom
- Branch: British Army
- Rank: Major-General
- Units: 93rd Regiment of Foot
- Conflicts: Crimean War; Indian Mutiny
- Awards: Victoria Cross; Order of the Medjidieh (Ottoman Empire)

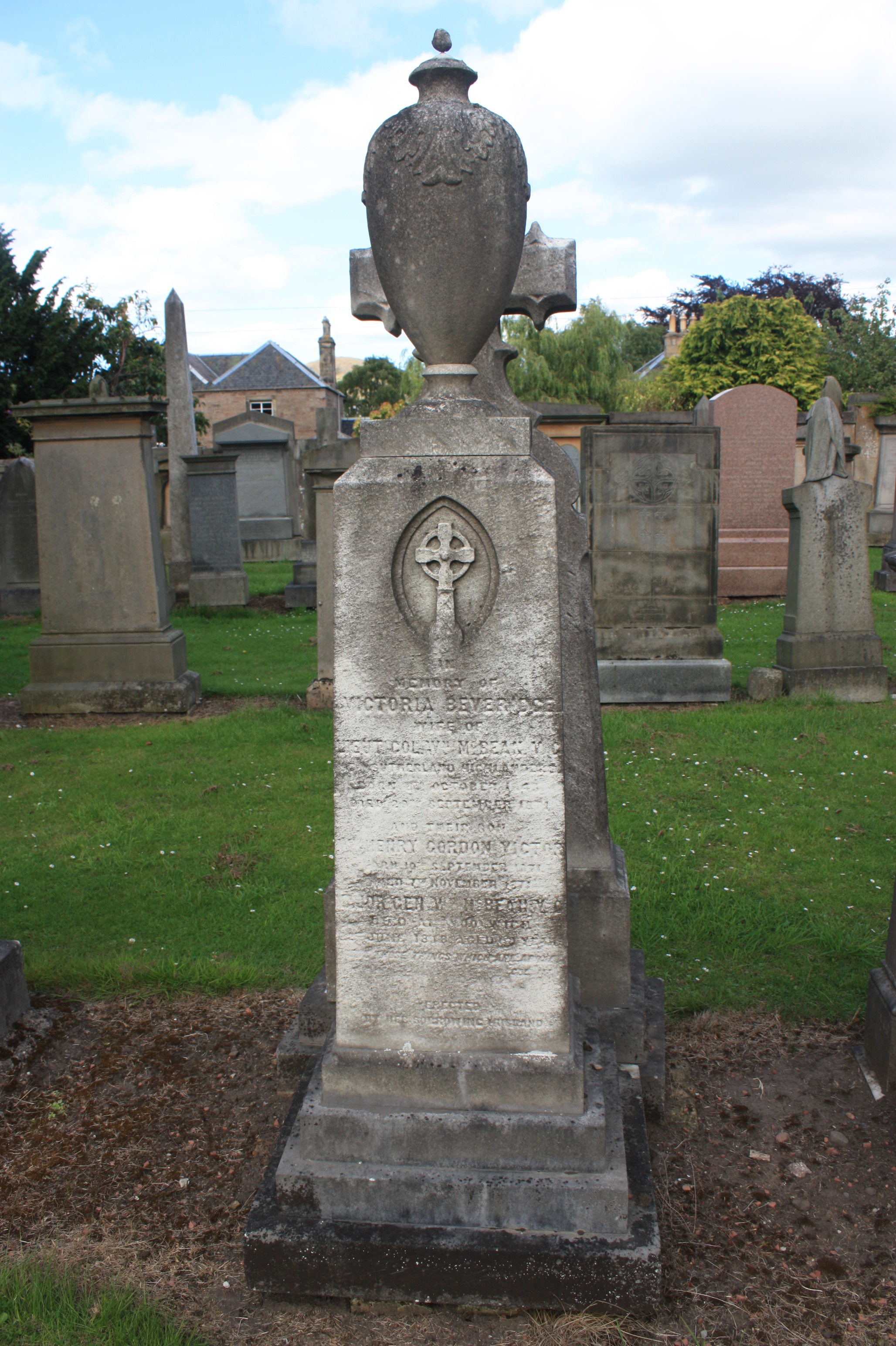
The grave of William McBean VC, Grange Cemetery, Edinburgh

Major-General William McBean VC (1 January 1819 – 22 June 1878) was a Scottish officer in the British Army and a recipient of the Victoria Cross, the highest and most prestigious award for gallantry in the face of the enemy that can be awarded to British and Commonwealth forces.

== Early life ==
He was born in Inverness on New Year's Day, 1 January 1819, the son of John McBean (McBain), a shoemaker in Inverness, and his wife Ann Gordon. The year of his birth is found cited as 1818 and 1819, and his date of death is found cited as 22 June and 23 June 1878. The correct dates appear to be those recorded on inscriptions on his parents' gravestone in Inverness's old Chapel Yard and on the plinth supporting a bust of General McBean, donated by his brother's family, which is inside Inverness Town House. The inscription on the former states that he died at Woolwich 22 June 1878, and the inscription on the latter states he was Born at Inverness January 1819. Died at Woolwich 22nd June 1878. His father has been said to have been a ploughman, but General McBean's baptism record, and his parents' gravestone, placed there by him and his brother, confirms his father was a shoemaker. It is still possible that his father could have been a ploughman at some other point in his life, but there appears to be no evidence on this point.

Around 1835 he enlisted as a private in the 93rd Sutherland Highlanders. He rose through the ranks and received a commission on 10 August 1854, at the rank of Ensign, being promoted to Lieutenant by December. In December 1854 he sailed to the Crimea and took part in the Siege of Sebastopol and the assaults on Redan on 18 June and 8 September 1855. He received the associated campaign medals, the Crimea Medal with clasp and the Turkish Crimea Medal.

Serving in the Indian Mutiny over and above his actions at Lucknow, he was present at the defeat of the Gwalior Contingent at Cawnpore, the affair at Kalee Nuddee, the affair of Alligunge, and Battle of Bareilly and the evacuation of the fort at Mithowli.

== The Victoria Cross ==
He was 39 years old, and a lieutenant in the 93rd Regiment of Foot (later Argyll and Sutherland Highlanders - Princess Louise's), British Army during the Indian Mutiny when the following deed took place at Lucknow, India for which he was awarded the VC.

Lieutenant and Adjutant, (now Captain) William McBean

Date of Act of Bravery, 11th March, 1858

For distinguished personal bravery in killing eleven of the enemy with his own hand in the main breach of the Begum Bagh at Lucknow, on the 11th March, 1858.

He personally killed 11 people in hand-to-hand combat during the attack. Afterwards he casually stated "it only took me twenty minutes". He was promoted to Captain a few months later on 16 August 1858. Queen Victoria agreed the award on 24 December and he received the Victoria Cross on the parade ground at Umbeyla from Major General Robert Garrett on 6 February 1859.

== Further information ==
He held every rank from private to major general, and never left the 93rd Regiment, becoming its Commanding Officer on 29 October 1873 in place of Colonel Burroughs CB.

He died at Shooter's Hill in London on 22 June 1878 but was buried with his wife, Victoria Beveridge (d.1871) and infant son, Henry Gordon Victor McBean, in Grange Cemetery in south Edinburgh. His wife had died a few days after giving birth, and the son died a few weeks after. The grave lies to the east side of the eastern path, just south of its midpoint.

== The medal ==
His Victoria Cross is displayed at the Argyll and Sutherland Highlanders Museum in Stirling Castle, Scotland.
