= John Paton (VC) =

Scottish recipient of the Victoria Cross

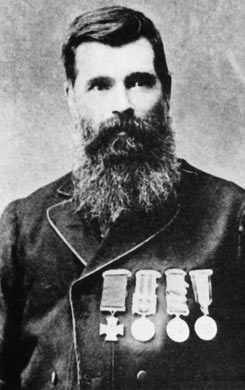
- Paton wearing his medals.
- Born: 23 December 1833; Stirling, Scotland
- Died: 1 April 1914 (aged 80); Summer Hill, New South Wales, Australia
- Burial place: Rookwood Cemetery, Sydney
- Military career
- Allegiance: United Kingdom
- Branch: British Army
- Rank: Sergeant
- Units: 93rd Regiment of Foot
- Conflicts: Crimean War; Indian Mutiny
- Awards: Victoria Cross
- Other work: Prison Governor

John Paton VC (23 December 1833 – 1 April 1914) was a Scottish recipient of the Victoria Cross, the highest and most prestigious award for gallantry in the face of the enemy that can be awarded to British and Commonwealth forces.

== Details ==
Paton was 23 years old, and a sergeant in the 93rd Regiment of Foot (later The Argyll and Sutherland Highlanders, British Army during the Indian Mutiny when the following deed took place at the Siege of Lucknow for which he was awarded the VC:

For distinguished personal gallantry at Lucknow, on the 16th of November, 1857, in proceeding alone round the Shah Nujjiff under an extremely heavy-fire, discovering a breach on the opposite side, to which he afterwards conducted the Regiment, by which means that important position was taken. Elected by the non-commissioned officers of the Regiment.

He was celebrated as "The Hero of Lucknow".

He described the Battle of Lucknow to a journalist in 1907, "There were only 2,500 on our side and it was estimated that the enemy numbered over 70,000 sepoys and mark you they were not savages but well trained soldiers armed and drilled the same as we were."

He emigrated to Australia in 1861 becoming a prison governor. He lived with his family in a cottage (no longer standing) near the corner of Prospect Road and Robert Street at Summer Hill in Sydney's inner western suburbs. He worshipped at St. Andrews Anglican Church on the corner of Henson and Smith Streets, Summer Hill. A magnificent bronze memorial was erected in his memory by his sisters and is located on the wall to the immediate left upon entering the church main entrance. A park located across the street from the church is named in his honour His grave (including family members) is in the Anglican Monumental Area "AAA, number 414" of Rookwood Necropolis, Strathfield, Sydney. This impressive monumental grave was completely refurbished in mid-2013 by the Office of Australian War Graves, whose duty includes maintaining in perpetuity the graves of all VC Heroes buried in Australia.

He died at his home on the 1st of April 1914 aged 81. After a memorial service at St Andrews Church his flag draped coffin was conveyed by a military honour guard to Summer Hill Railway Station on a horse drawn gun carriage, the bells of St Andrews tolling as locals lined the streets to pay their respect. The coffin was loaded on a funeral train and taken to Rookwood Cemetery, where he was buried with full military honours.

Never one to romanticise war he later said, "The scenes of horror at the final relief of Lucknow I cannot even now dwell upon. Our joy at reunion with our comrades and the safety of the woman and children, turned us into hysterical woman". Although honored throughout his life to have won the Victoria Cross he wasn't overtly sentimental about it, telling a journalist, "The much vaunted V.C. carries with it a pension of £10 per annum. Now it must be remembered that men who got the V.C. are generally pretty badly broken up in achieving it. I was not, but most of those gaining it have been left minus a leg or an arm, or have been in some way incapacitated. £10 a year seems but a paltry sum to recompense men so badly smashed. My complaint is not a personal one, as I have explained I came through without a scratch."

== The medal ==
His Victoria Cross was originally donated to St Andrews Church of England, Summer Hill, by his daughters and for years it was proudly displayed with his other medals in a cabinet directly beneath his large bronze memorial plaque, however after it was stolen in the early 1980s and recovered soon afterwards with a subsequent attempt at theft the church decided to honour John Paton's memory by donating it to his old regiment in the town of his birth.

His valour under fire winning him the admiration of his regiment, non-commissioned officers nominating him for the VC, one of six soldiers at the Battle of Lucknow to win one, bestowed by Queen Victoria at a ceremony in England. He also received campaign medals for bravery, including: 'Relief of Lucknow (1857–1858)' - 'Crimea (1855)' and one for 'Sevastopol, Balaklava and Alma (1854)'

His Victoria Cross is displayed at the Argyll and Sutherland Highlanders Museum, Stirling Castle, Scotland.
