= James Kenny (VC) =

British soldier and recipient of the Victoria Cross

- Born: c. 1824; Dublin, Ireland
- Died: 2 October 1862 (aged 37–38); Mooltan, British India
- Burial place: Mooltan Cemetery
- Military career
- Allegiance: United Kingdom
- Branch: British Army
- Service years: † 1862
- Rank: Private
- Units: 53rd Regiment of Foot
- Conflicts: Indian Mutiny
- Awards: Victoria Cross

James Kenny VC (c. 1824 – 3 October 1862) was an Irish recipient of the Victoria Cross, the highest and most prestigious award for gallantry in the face of the enemy that can be awarded to British and Commonwealth forces.

== Details ==
He was approximately 33 years old, and a private in the 53rd Regiment of Foot (later, the King's Shropshire Light Infantry), British Army during the Indian Mutiny when the following deed on 16 November 1857 at the assault on the Secundra Bagh during the Relief of Lucknow led to the award of the Victoria Cross:

53rd Regiment. Private J. Kenny

Date of Act of Bravery: 16th November 1857

For conspicuous bravery at the taking of the Secundra Bagh, at Lucknow, on the 16th of November, 1857, and for volunteering to bring up ammunition to his Company, under a very severe cross fire. Elected by the private soldiers of the Regiment.

He was killed in action, Mooltan, British India, on 2 October 1862.
