= James Munro (soldier) =

Scottish recipient of the Victoria Cross

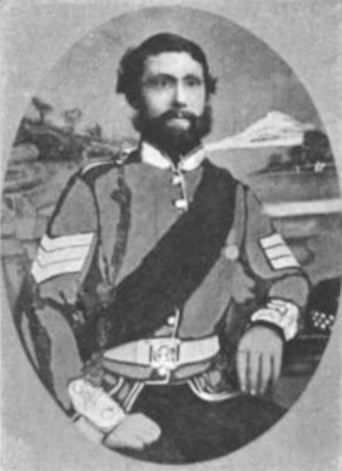
- Born: 11 October 1826; Nigg, Ross and Cromarty, Scotland
- Died: 5 February 1871 (aged 44); Inverness, Scotland
- Burial place: Craig Dunain Hospital Cemetery, Inverness
- Military career
- Branch: British Army
- Rank: Colour Sergeant
- Units: 93rd Regiment of Foot
- Conflicts: Crimean War; Indian Mutiny
- Awards: Victoria Cross

James Munro VC (11 October 1826 – 5 February 1871) was a Scottish recipient of the Victoria Cross, the highest and most prestigious award for gallantry in the face of the enemy that can be awarded to British and Commonwealth forces.

He was 20 when he joined up, and by 1854 he was a sergeant serving in the Crimean War. Eighteen months later, his regiment went to India and in 1857 Munro was promoted to colour sergeant.

James Munro received his medal from Queen Victoria at Windsor Castle in 1860, two years after he was discharged due to illness caused by his wounds.

== Details ==
Munro was 31 years old, and a colour-sergeant in the 93rd Regiment of Foot (Sutherland Highlanders), British Army during the Indian Mutiny when the following deed took place on 16 November 1857 at the Lucknow, India for which he was awarded the VC:

For devoted gallantry, at Secunderabagh, on the 16th November, 1857, in having promptly rushed to the rescue of Captain E. Walsh, of the same corps, when wounded, and in danger of his life, whom he carried to a place of comparative safety, to which place the Serjeant was brought in, very shortly afterwards, badly wounded.

== The medal ==
His Victoria Cross is displayed at the Argyll and Sutherland Highlanders Museum, Stirling Castle, Scotland.

== See also ==
- Clan Munro
