= 93rd (Sutherland Highlanders) Regiment of Foot =

93rd Regiment of Foot
- Active: 1799–1881
- Country: Kingdom of Great Britain (1799–1800); United Kingdom (1801–1881)
- Branch: British Army
- Type: Infantry
- Size: One battalion (two battalions 1813–1816)
- Garrison/HQ: Castlehill Barracks, Aberdeen
- March: The Thin Red Line; Highland Laddie; The Campbell March
- Engagements: Napoleonic Wars; War of 1812; Crimean War; Indian Rebellion

The 93rd (Sutherland Highlanders) Regiment of Foot was a Line Infantry Regiment of the British Army, raised in 1799. Under the Childers Reforms, it amalgamated with the 91st (Argyllshire Highlanders) Regiment of Foot to form the Argyll and Sutherland Highlanders.

== History ==
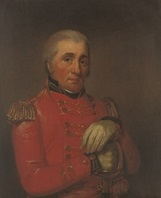
General William Wemyss, founder of the regiment, circle of Sir Henry Raeburn

=== Formation ===
The regiment was raised from the Sutherland Fencibles by Major-General William Wemyss on behalf of the Countess of Sutherland as the 93rd (Highland) Regiment of Foot on 16 April 1799. The first muster of the regiment took place at Skail in Strathnaver in August 1800. One of the soldiers who attended the muster was Sergeant Samuel Macdonald, a soldier who stood six feet ten inches tall and had a chest measuring 48 inches. The Countess of Sutherland, on seeing Sergeant Macdonald, donated a special allowance of 2 shillings 6 pence a day, and stated that anyone as large as Macdonald "must require more sustenance than his military pay can afford." According to historian James Hunter, at a time when the Duke of Wellington who was the British military's most eminent commander could describe his soldiers as "the very scum of the earth" who were eked out of precarious livelihoods on the outermost margins of urban society, the Highlanders of the 93rd Regiment of Foot, were, by contrast, described as "the children of respectable farmers"; "connected by strong ties of neighborhood and even of relationship"; "a sort of family corps". Hunter also noted that in an era when military order was customarily maintained by regular floggings, one Sutherland Highlander company went nineteen years without having a single man punished. Thus it transpired that the 93rd were a "highly valued, picture of military discipline and moral rectitude".

=== Napoleonic Wars ===
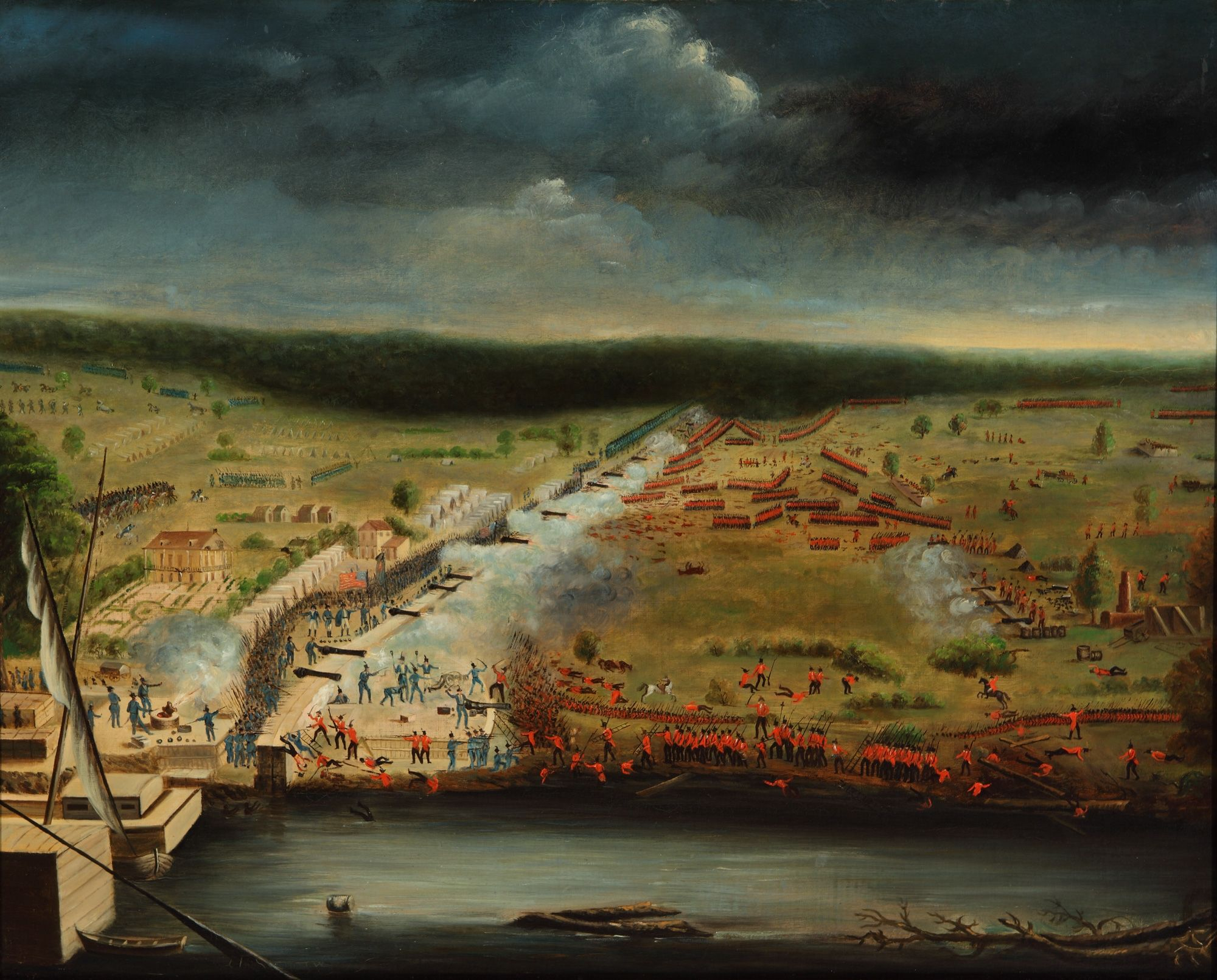
The Battle of New Orleans, January 1815, by Jean Hyacinthe de Laclotte of the Louisiana Militia

The regiment was dispatched from Fort George to Guernsey in September 1800. It returned to Scotland in September 1802 from where it was deployed to Dublin in February 1803 to assist in quelling an insurrection.

It was ordered to embark for Jamaica in July 1805 but, after fortnight aboard ship, the orders were canceled and the regiment sailed for the Cape of Good Hope. It arrived at Table Bay in January 1806 and joined the Highland Brigade which landed at Lospard Bay with orders to capture Cape Colony from the Dutch forces there. The regiment took part in the Battle of Blaauwberg, during which 35 soldiers from the regiment drowned during the amphibious landing. The battle led to the surrender of the Dutch forces a few days later. Major John Graham was transferred from the 93rd regiment to lead the newly formed Cape Regiment, made up from the disbanded Cape Dutch Corps Pandoeren. The 93rd remained in the colony until April 1814 when it embarked for home.

A second battalion was raised in Inverness in May 1813. The 2nd Battalion was deployed to Newfoundland in April 1814 but embarked for home in October 1815 and was disbanded the following year.

Meanwhile, the 1st battalion embarked for North America in September 1814 for service in the War of 1812. It anchored at the entrance of Lake Borgne off the Gulf of Mexico in December 1814 and then advanced up the left bank of the Mississippi River towards New Orleans. It came under fire from an American armed schooner on the river and destroyed it. The regiment next saw action at the Battle of New Orleans in January 1815. British troops overran and captured the American position on the right bank of river while, on the left bank where the main assault occurred, a detachment of light infantry companies including that of the 93rd Regiment of Foot, captured the advance redoubt on the American right beside the river. However, the British assault on the left bank faltered and General John Keane led the main body of the 93rd Regiment of Foot diagonally across the field to support the faltering British right flank attack near the swamp. Following the death of Lieutenant Colonel Robert Dale, the regiment's commanding officer, no orders were issued either to advance or to withdraw so the regiment stood fast and was mown down. General John Lambert having taken command upon the death of General Edward Pakenham finally sent orders to withdraw and after a futile attempt to advance the regiment withdrew from the field. The "immense bravery" shown by the 93rd in this advance was noted by the American Paul Wellman, General Andrew Jackson's biographer:

To the very edge of the canal before the rampart the few that were left of the kilted regiment marched, then halted there. The men who had been detailed to bring scaling ladders and fascines had failed to come up. Unable to go forward, too proud to retreat, although the regiment behind them had all fallen back. At length a mere handful of what had been the magnificent regiment slowly retired, still in unbroken order, still turning to face the foe. From the ramparts the Americans cheered them wildly. All rifle fire ceased.

The 1st Battalion embarked for home and disembarked at Cork in Ireland in May 1815.

=== The Canadian rebellion ===
The regiment embarked for the West Indies in November 1823. It was based in Barbados until February 1826 when it moved to Antigua and Saint Kitts. It embarked for home again in April 1834. New colours were presented to the regiment by the Duke of Wellington in October 1834. The regiment then moved to Dublin in October 1835. It embarked to Canada in January 1838 to service in the Patriot War: it landed in Halifax, Nova Scotia in March 1838 and saw action at the Battle of the Windmill in November 1838. It remained in Canada until embarking for home in August 1848.

=== The Crimean War ===
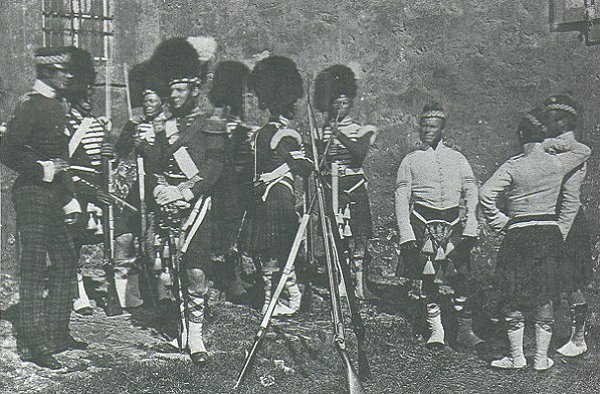
An early photo, taken at Scutari, of officers and men of the 93rd Highland Regiment, shortly before their engagement in the Crimean War, 1854.

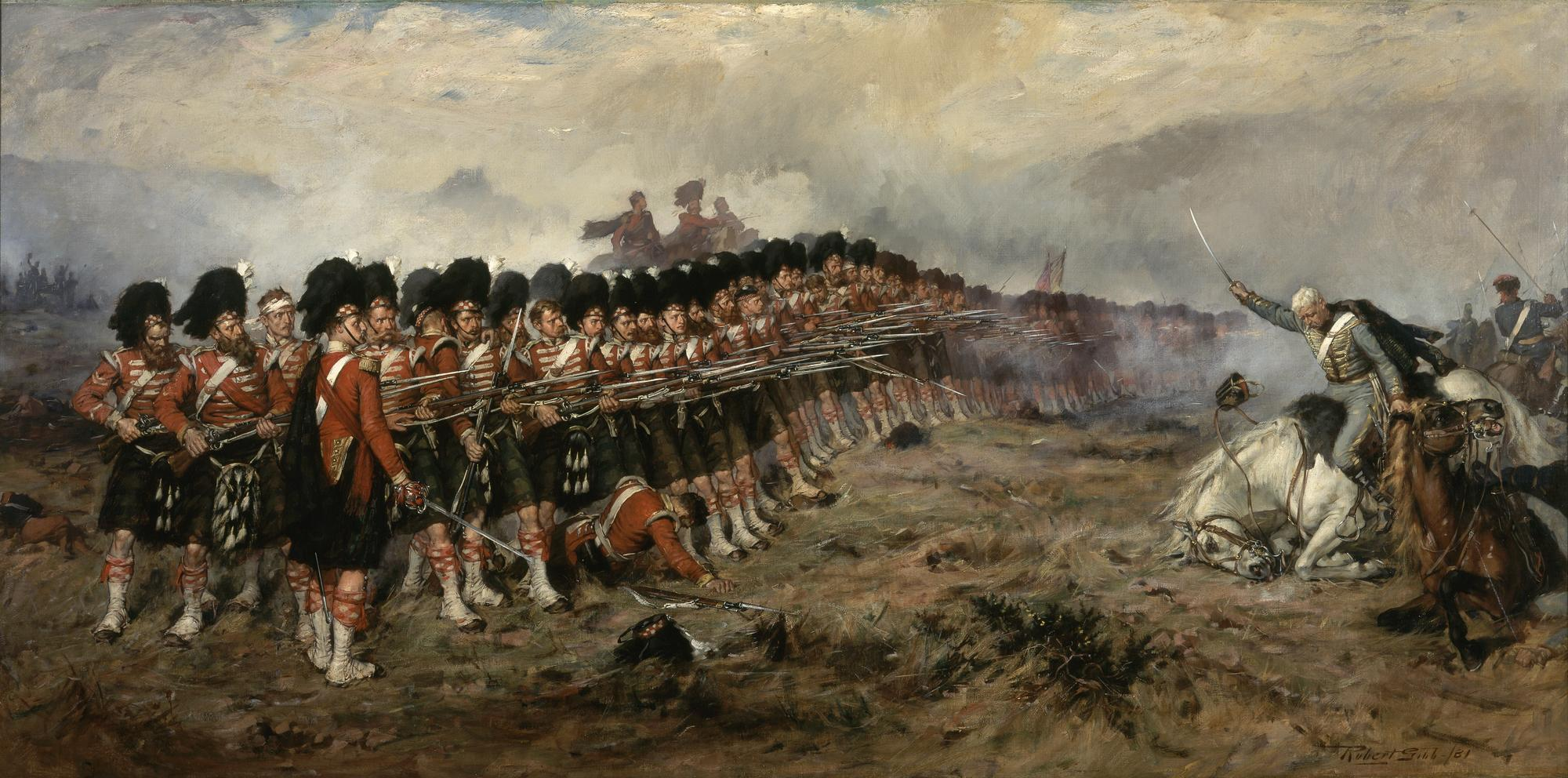
1881 painting The Thin Red Line by Robert Gibb, depicting the 93rd Highlanders during the Battle of Balaclava in October 1854.

The regiment arrived at Stirling Castle in October 1848 and provided a Guard of Honour for Queen Victoria on her visit to Glasgow in August 1849.

It embarked for the Crimea for service in the Crimean War in February 1854. As part of Brigadier-General Colin Campbell's Highland Brigade, it took part in the Battle of Alma in September 1854. On 25 October 1854, it was stationed outside the British-controlled port of Balaklava as part of its very thin defences. The Russian Army sent a large force to attack Balaklava, precipitating the Battle of Balaclava. The Russian threat was countered in part by the charge of General James Scarlett's Heavy Cavalry Brigade but the rest of the Russian force headed straight for the 93rd Regiment of Foot.

Campbell told the men of the 93rd Regiment of Foot as he rode down the line: "There is no retreat from here, men...you must die where you stand." One of the troops, John Scott, responded: "Aye, Sir Colin. An needs be, we'll do that." As the younger soldiers moved forward for a bayonet charge, Campbell called out: "93rd, 93rd, damn all that eagerness!" The Times journalist W. H. Russell commenting on the action reported:

The Russians dash at the Highlanders. The ground flies beneath their horses' feet; gathering speed at every stride, they dash on towards that thin red streak topped with a line of steel.

This led to the regiment's nickname: "The Thin Red Line". The historical author, Thomas Carter, wrote:

Advancing in great strength, supported by artillery, the Russian cavalry appeared on the scene. One portion of them assailed the front and right flank of the 93rd., but were instantly driven back by the vigorous and steady fire of that distinguished regiment, under Lieutenant-Colonel [William Bernard] Ainslie.

The regiment also took part in the Siege of Sevastopol in June 1855 before embarking for home in June 1856.

=== The Indian rebellion ===
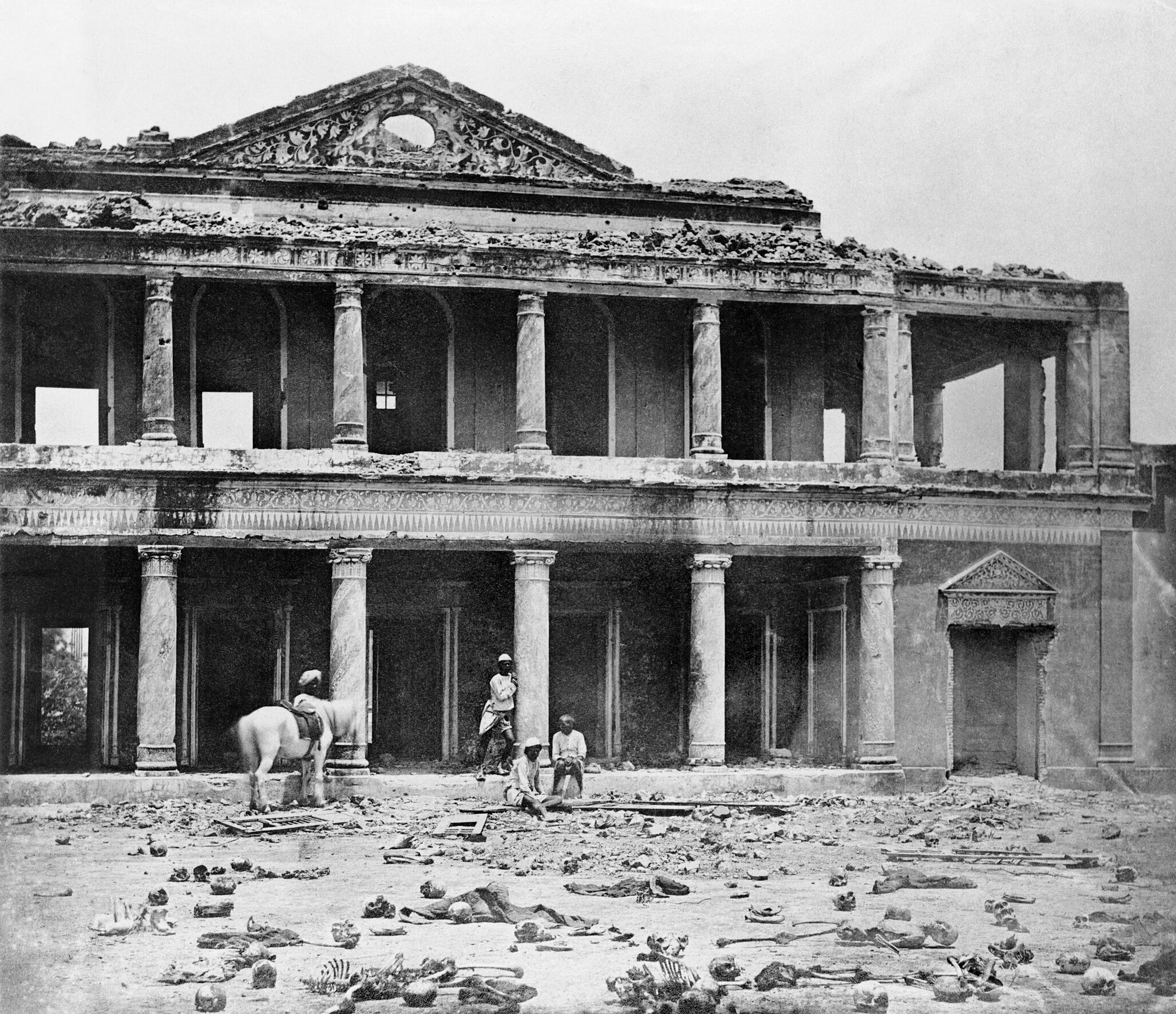
Interior of the Sikandar Bagh after the slaughter of 2,000 rebels by the 93rd Highlanders and 4th Punjab Regiment in November 1857

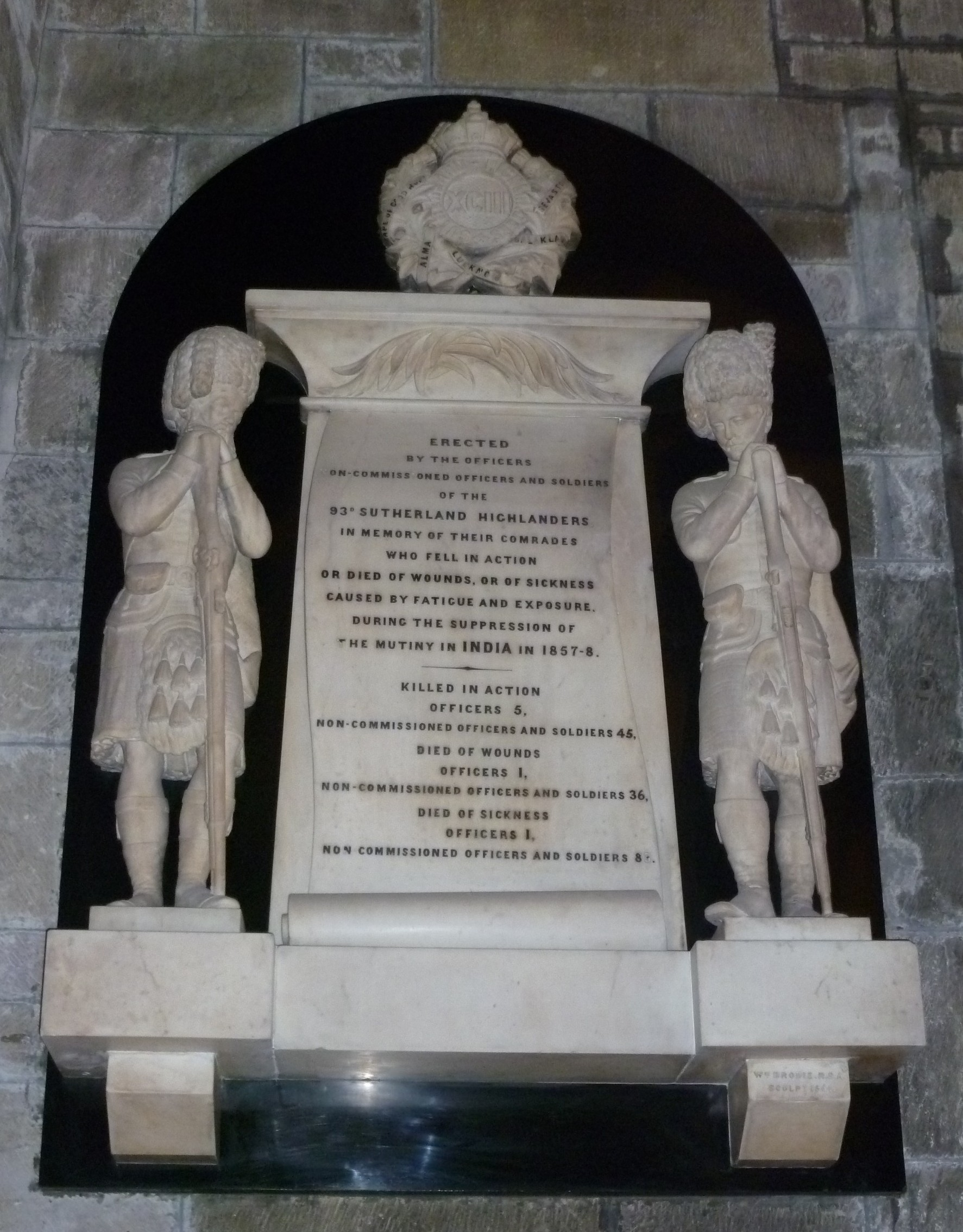
Regimental memorial for the Indian Mutiny in St. Giles High Kirk, Edinburgh

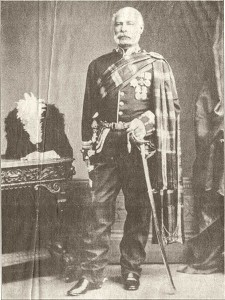
William McBean, V.C

The regiment sailed for India in June 1857 to help suppress the Indian Rebellion. It arrived at Calcutta in September 1857 and was welcomed by General Sir Colin Campbell. Under heavy enemy fire, the regiment, together with the 4th Punjab Infantry Regiment took part in the storming and capture of Sikandar Bagh, a walled garden fortification, on 16 November 1857. Six Victoria Crosses were awarded to members of the regiment for their service in this action. At daybreak on 17 November 1857 the Regimental colour was hoisted on top of a tower as a signal to the beleaguered garrison of the Residency at Lucknow. On the night of 19 November 1857 the regiment provided covering fire as the evacuation of the Residency took place. The regiment then saw action again at the Second Battle of Cawnpore in December 1857.

The regiment also took part in the storming and capture of Kaiser Bagh in March 1858: a Victoria Cross was awarded to Lieutenant William McBean for his role in killing eleven rebels with his sword during the engagement. It went on to take part in the capture of the city of Bareilly in May 1858 and a skirmish at Russulpore in October 1858. It was renamed the 93rd (Sutherland Highlanders) Regiment of Foot in 1861 before embarking for home in February 1870. The regiment disembarked at Burntisland in March 1870 and received new colours from the Duchess of Sutherland in August 1871. It moved to Curragh Camp in Ireland in May 1877 and to Gibraltar in January 1879.

=== Amalgamation ===
As part of the Cardwell Reforms of the 1870s, where single-battalion regiments were linked together to share a single depot and recruiting district in the United Kingdom, the 93rd was linked with the 92nd (Gordon Highlanders) Regiment of Foot, and assigned to district no. 56 at Castlehill Barracks in Aberdeen. On 1 July 1881 the Childers Reforms came into effect and the regiment amalgamated with the 91st (Argyllshire Highlanders) Regiment of Foot to form the Argyll and Sutherland Highlanders.

== Regimental religious traditions ==
The 93rd Regiment of Foot was regarded as the most religious regiment in the British Army. It formed its own parish, with ministers and elders chosen from the ranks by the ranks. Two sergeants, two corporals, and two privates were elected to serve as elders. The regiment was also said to be the only regiment with its own regular communion plate.

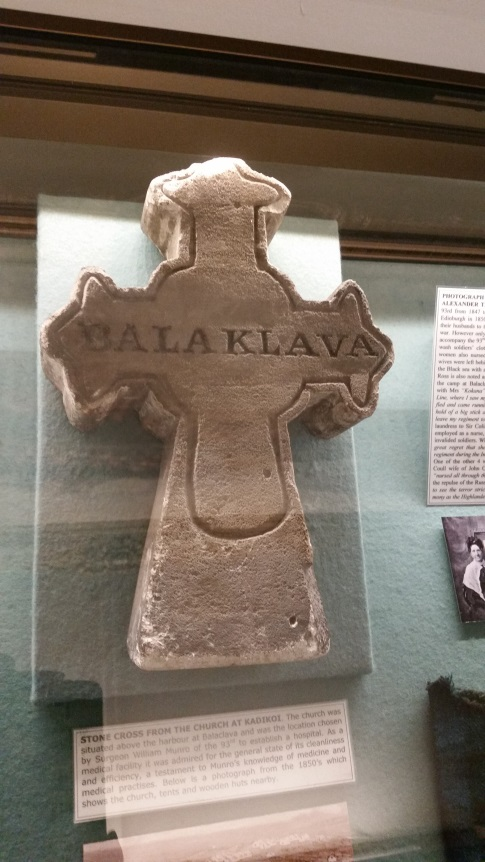
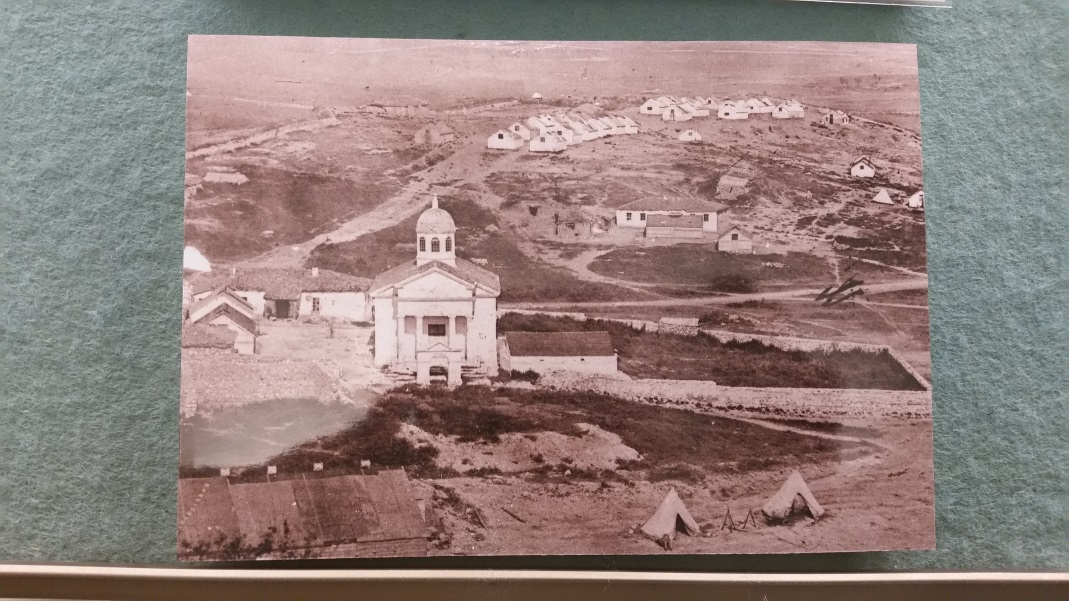
Stone cross from the church at Kadikoi: The church was situated above the harbour at Balaklava and was the location chosen by Surgeon William Munro of the 93rd to establish a hospital. As a medical facility, it was admired for the general state of its cleanliness and efficiency, a testament to Munro’s knowledge of medicine and medical practices. This photograph from the 1850s which shows the church, tents and wooden huts nearby.
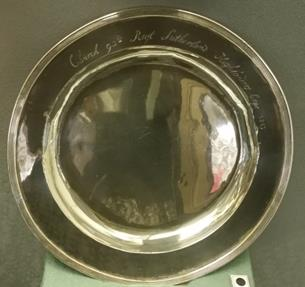
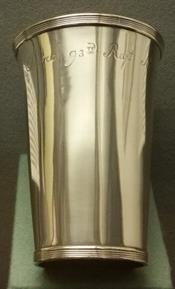
Silver Communion Plate and Chalice, inscribed "Church 93rd Regt Sutherland Highlanders, Cape1813". Both pieces were purchased in South Africa by the ordinary soldiers of the 93rd. They were used during the Communion service to distribute bread and wine. Originally the chalice had a lid but this was lost during the Second World War. Both the plate and chalice were continued to be used by the Regiment up until the late 20th century when copies were made and the original communion set given over to The Argyll and Sutherland Highlanders Regimental Museum. The copies were then used during Regimental Kirk service.

== Battle honours ==
Battle honours won by the regiment were:

- Cape of Good Hope 1806
- Crimean War: Alma, Balaklava, Sevastopol
- Indian Mutiny: Lucknow

== Victoria Crosses ==
- Lance Corporal John Dunlay, Indian Mutiny (16 November 1857)
- Private Peter Grant, Indian Mutiny (16 November 1857)
- Private David MacKay, Indian Mutiny (16 November 1857)
- Lieutenant William McBean, Indian Mutiny (11 March 1858)
- Colour Sergeant James Munro, Indian Mutiny (16 November 1857)
- Sergeant John Paton, Indian Mutiny (16 November 1857)
- Captain William George Drummond Stewart, Indian Mutiny (16 November 1857)

== Colonels of the Regiment ==
Colonels of the Regiment were:

93rd (Highland) Regiment of Foot

- 1800–1822: Gen. William Wemyss of Wemyss
- 1822: Gen. Sir Thomas Hislop, Bt, GCB
- 1822–1832: Lt-Gen. Sir Hudson Lowe, KCB, GCMG
- 1832–1833: Lt-Gen. Sir John Cameron, KCB
- 1833–1840: Lt-Gen. Sir Jasper Nicolls, KCB
- 1840–1850: Gen. Sir James Dawes Douglas, GCB
- 1850–1852: Lt-Gen. William Wemyss (son of General William Wemyss, above)
- 1852–1858: Lt-Gen. Edward Parkinson, CB
- 1858–1860: F.M. Sir Colin Campbell, 1st Baron Clyde, GCB, KCSI
- 1860–1862: Lt-Gen. William Sutherland

93rd (Sutherland Highlanders) Regiment of Foot - (1861)

- 1862–1868: Gen. Alexander Fisher Macintosh, KH
- 1868–1873: Lt-Gen. Charles Craufurd Hay
- 1873–1875: Lt-Gen. Sir Henry William Stisted, KCB
- 1875–1876: Gen. Freeman Murray
- 1876–1880: Gen. William Munro, CB
- 1880: Gen. Mark Kerr Atherley
- 1880–1881: Gen. Hon. Sir Robert Rollo, KCB
- 1881: Regiment amalgamated with 91st (Princess Louise's Argyllshire Highlanders) Regiment of Foot to form Princess Louise's (Sutherland and Argyll Highlanders)

== See also ==
- Argyll and Sutherland Highlanders
- Order of battle for the Balaclava campaign
- 93rd Highland Regiment F.C.

== Sources ==
- Burgoyne, Roderick Hamilton (1883). Historical Records of the 93rd Sutherland Highlanders. London: Richard Bentley & Sons.
- Carter, Thomas (1861). Medals of the British Army and How They were Won: The Crimean Campaign. Groombridge & Sons, London.
- Farwell, Byron (1981). Mr. Kipling's Army: All The Queen's Men. New York: W.W. Norton. ISBN 978-0393304442.
- Greenwood, Adrian (2015). Victoria's Scottish Lion: The Life of Colin Campbell, Lord Clyde. UK: History Press. p. 496. ISBN 978-0-75095-685-7.
- Hunter, James (2015). Set Adrift Upon the World - The Sutherland Clearances. Birlinn. ISBN 978-1780272689.
- McElwee, William (1988). Argyll and Sutherland Highlanders. New York: Osprey Publishing. ISBN 978-0850450859.
- Royle, Trevor (2000). Crimea: The Great Crimean War 1854–1856. Abacus. ISBN 978-0349112848.
