= David MacKay (VC) =

- Born: 23 November 1831; Caithness, Scotland
- Died: 18 November 1880 (aged 48); Lesmahagow, Lanarkshire
- Burial place: Lesmahagow Cemetery
- Military career
- Allegiance: United Kingdom
- Branch: British Army
- Rank: Sergeant
- Units: 93rd Highlanders
- Conflicts: Crimean War; Indian Mutiny
- Awards: Victoria Cross

David MacKay VC (23 November 1831 – 18 November 1880) was a Scottish recipient of the Victoria Cross (VC), the highest and most prestigious award for gallantry in the face of the enemy that can be awarded to United Kingdom and Commonwealth forces.

== Life ==
Born at Alterwall, Howe, Lyth, Scotland, the son of a farm labourer, he enlisted in the 93rd Highlanders (which became the 93rd Sutherland Highlanders and ultimately the Argyll and Sutherland Highlanders) on 23 December 1850 and served in the Crimean War.

== The VC ==
He was awarded the VC for an action at the Siege of Lucknow during the Indian Mutiny. His citation in the London Gazette dated 24 December 1858 reads:

For great personal gallantry in capturing an enemy colour after a most obstinate resistance, at the Secundrabagh, Lucknow, on the 16th of November 1857. He was severely wounded afterwards at the capture of the Shah Nujjif. Elected by the private soldiers of the Regiment

=== The medal ===
The whereabouts of the VC is unknown, Mackay sold it while he was still alive and it was auctioned around 1910.

== Memorial ==
Mackay was awarded the VC in 1857 but was buried in Lesmahagow cemetery in an unmarked grave. A ceremony was held at the cemetery on 14 November 1998 to unveil a marker erected near the grave.
