= Remi =

Belgic tribe

The Remi (Gaulish: Rēmi, 'the first, the princes') were a Belgic tribe dwelling in the Aisne, Vesle and Suippe river valleys during the Iron Age and the Roman period. Their territory roughly corresponded the modern Marne and Ardennes and parts of the Aisne and Meuse departments.

== Name ==
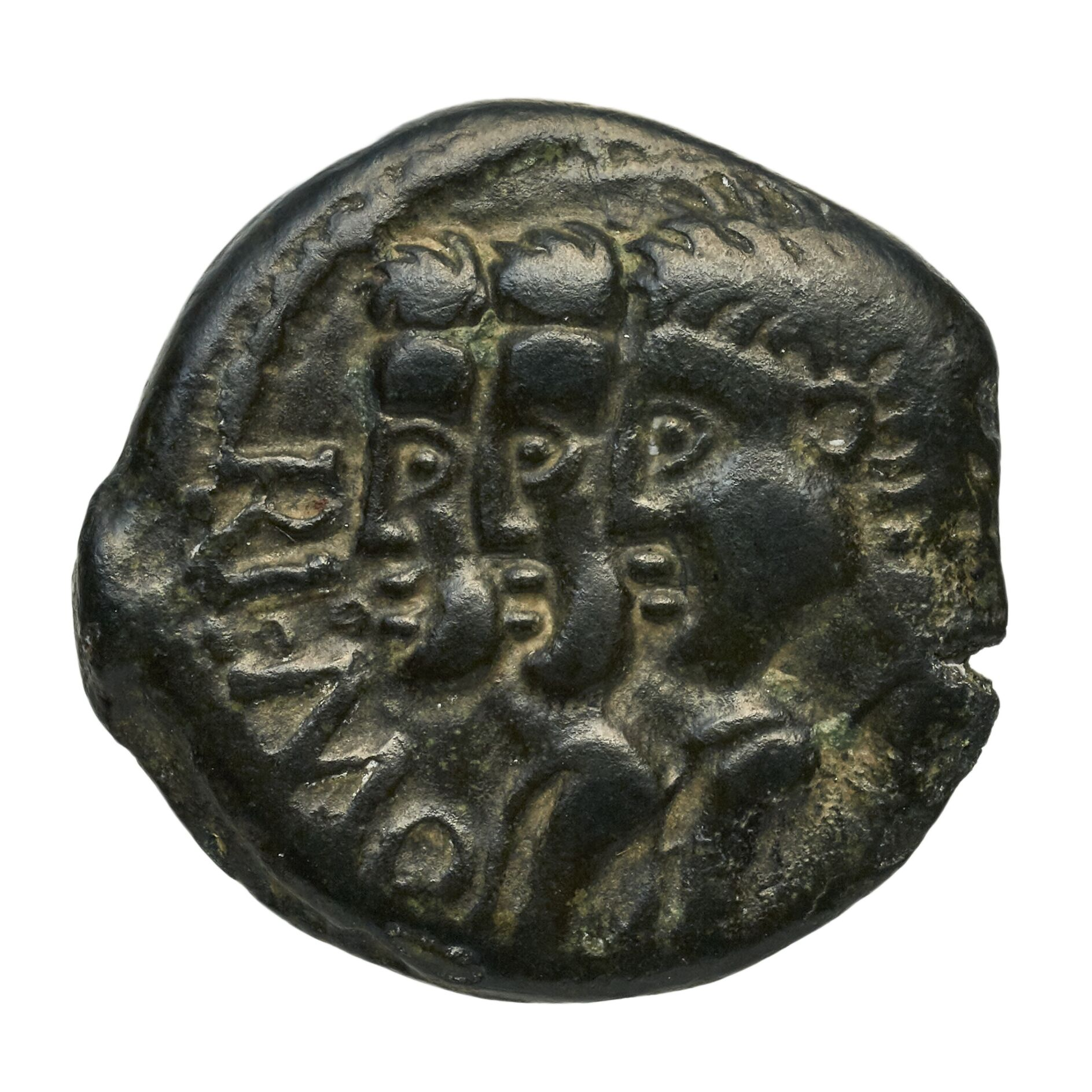
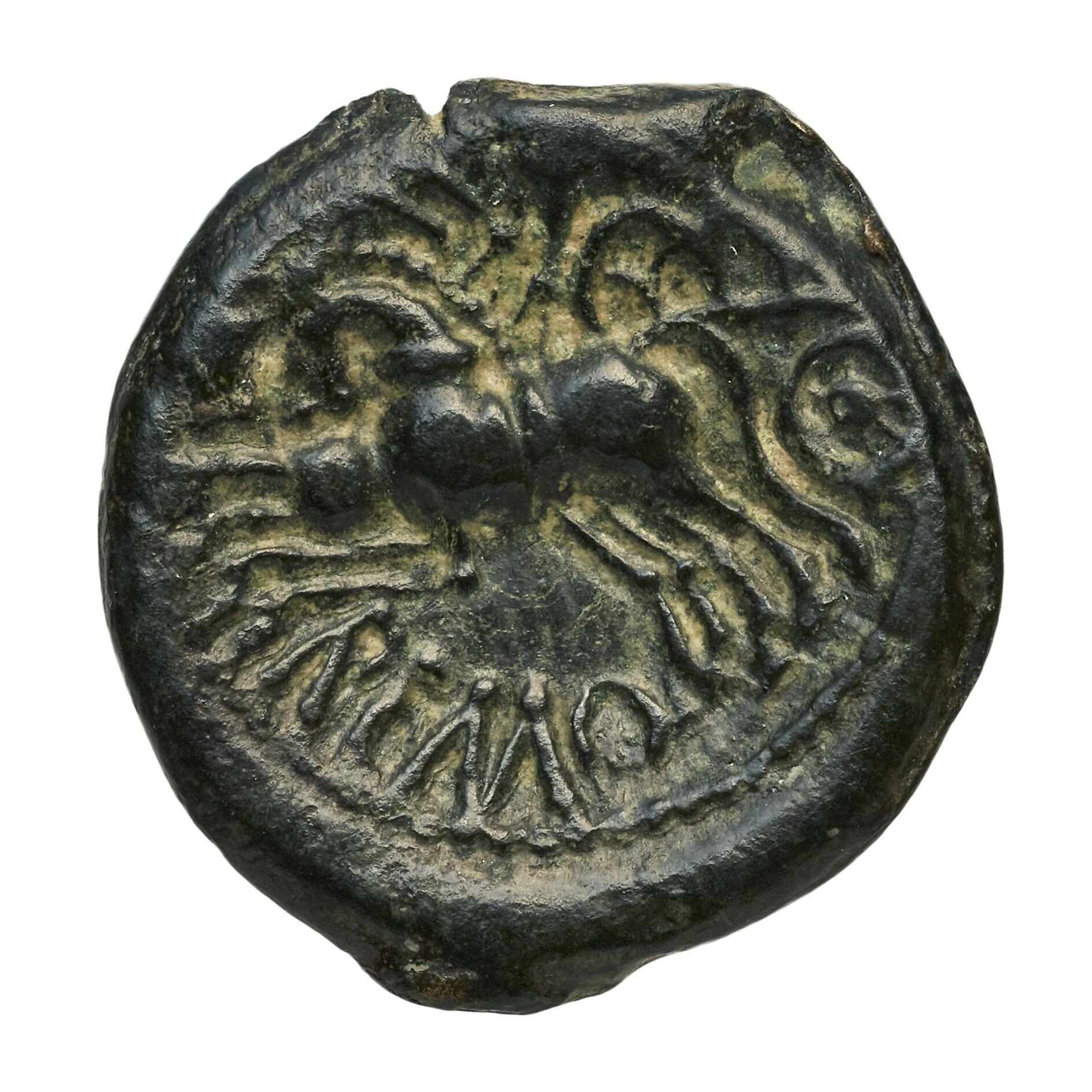
Bronze coin of the Remi, with an unusual triple- accolated bust design on the obverse, and a flurry of equine legs in a speeding chariot scene on the reverse; the legend on both sides reads REMO, singular of Remi

The Remi are named in Latin as such by Caesar (mid-1st c. BC), Pliny (1st c. AD), and Tacitus (early 2nd c. AD), and in Greek as Rhē̃moi (Ῥη̃μοι; var. Ῥημοὶ) by Strabo (early 1st c. AD), Ptolemy (2nd c. AD), and Cassius Dio (3rd c. AD). The Notitia Dignitatum (5th c. AD) gives Nemorum.

The Gaulish ethnonym Rēmi (sing. Rēmos) means 'the first ones', that is to say 'the princes'. It stems from a Proto-Celtic form reconstructed as *reimos ('first, prince, chief'; cf. Old Irish rem- 'in front of', Welsh rwyf 'prince, chief', Mid. Cornish ruif 'king'), itself from Proto-Indo-European *prei-mos ('first, leader'; cf. Latin prīmus 'furthest in front, foremost').

The city of Reims, attested ca. 400 AD as civitas Remorum (Rems in 1284), is named after the Belgic tribe.

== Geography ==
=== Territory ===
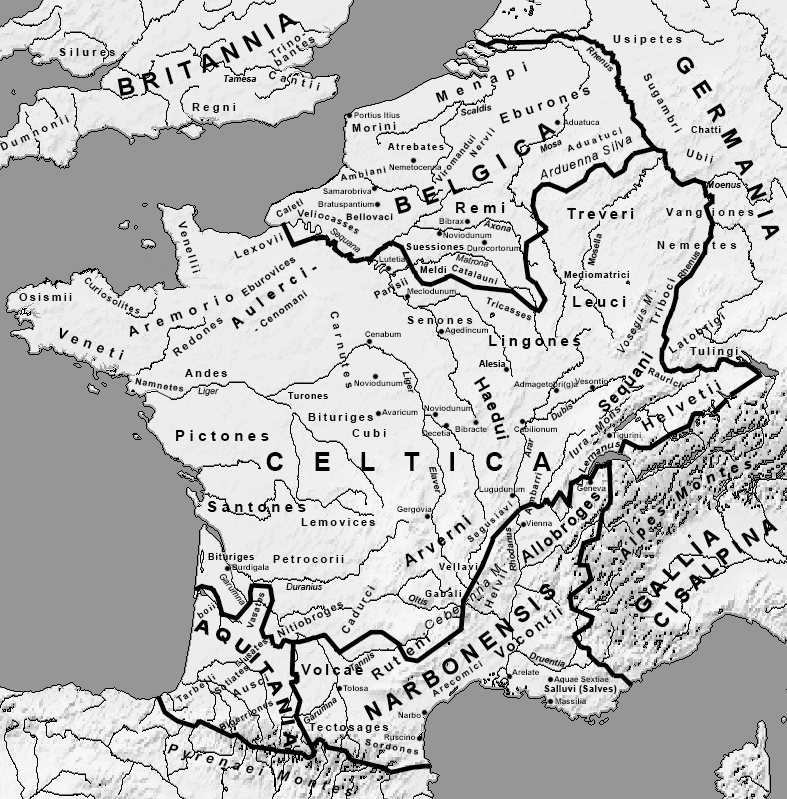
Gallic civitates at the time of Julius Caesar

The Remi dwelled in the Aisne, Vesle and Suippe valleys, with a heavy concentration in the middle Aisne valley. Their territory was located south of the Suessiones. As they were encircled by forests, however, the lands under their control nowhere bordered on neighbouring tribes.

=== Settlements ===
==== La Tène period ====
Before the Roman conquest (57 BC), the villages of the Remi were located along natural pathways and terrestrial cross-ways such as at Nizy-le-Comte, Thugny-Trugny, or Acy-Romance, which were occupied from the early 2nd century BC up until the 1st century AD. The rural areas of the Aisne valley were densely occupied and structured around trade relations with Mediterranean merchants, with large farms held by local aristocrats and bordered by numerous hamlets.

In the late 2nd–early 1st century BC, a few oppida were erected at Bibrax (Vieux Laon, Saint-Thomas), Nandin (Château-Porcien), Moulin à Vent (Voncq), La Cheppe, and Vieux Reims (Condé-sur-Suippe/Variscourt).

==== Roman period ====
At the beginning of the Roman period, the Remi left the villages and oppida that were in unfavourable positions within the emerging economic system of the Empire. For instance, the oppidum of Saint-Thomas (Bibrax) was abandoned in the middle of the 1st century BC, whereas Le Moulin à Vent, which bordered the trade route between Reims and Trier, developed into the town of Voncq, attested as Vongo vicus in the 3rd c. AD.

Durocortorum (modern Reims), a former oppidum probably built in the late 2nd–early 1st century BC and mentioned by Caesar in the mid-1st century BC, was promoted as the capital of their civitas at the end of the 1st century BC. The name of the settlement stems from the Gaulish word duron ('gates' > 'enclosed town, market town').

Secondary agglomerations of the Roman period are also known at Vervins, Chaourse, Nizy-le-Comte, Laon or Coucy-les-Eppes. Nizy-le-Comte, occupied at least until the end of the 4th century AD, probably reached around 80 hectares at its height.

== History ==
=== La Tène period ===
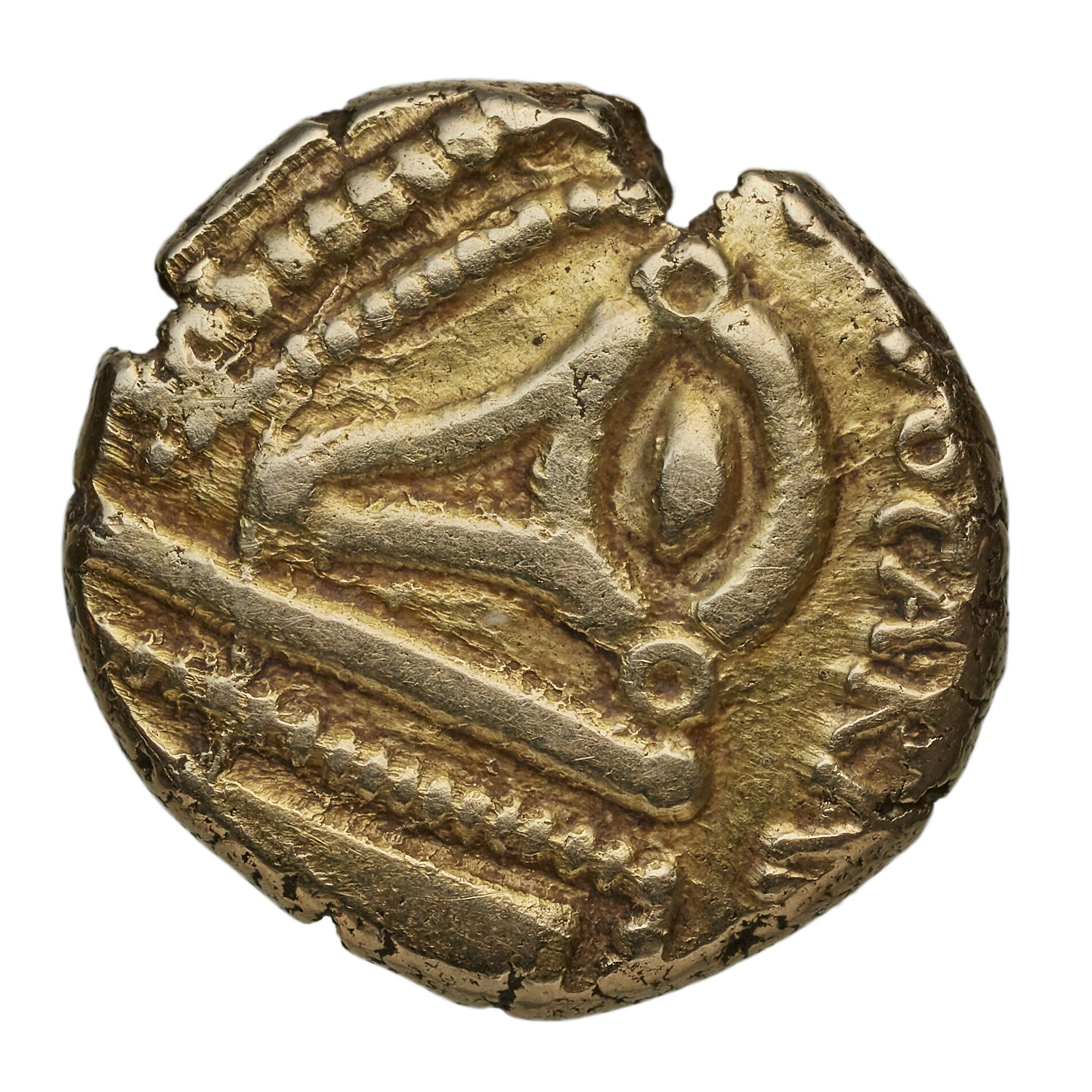
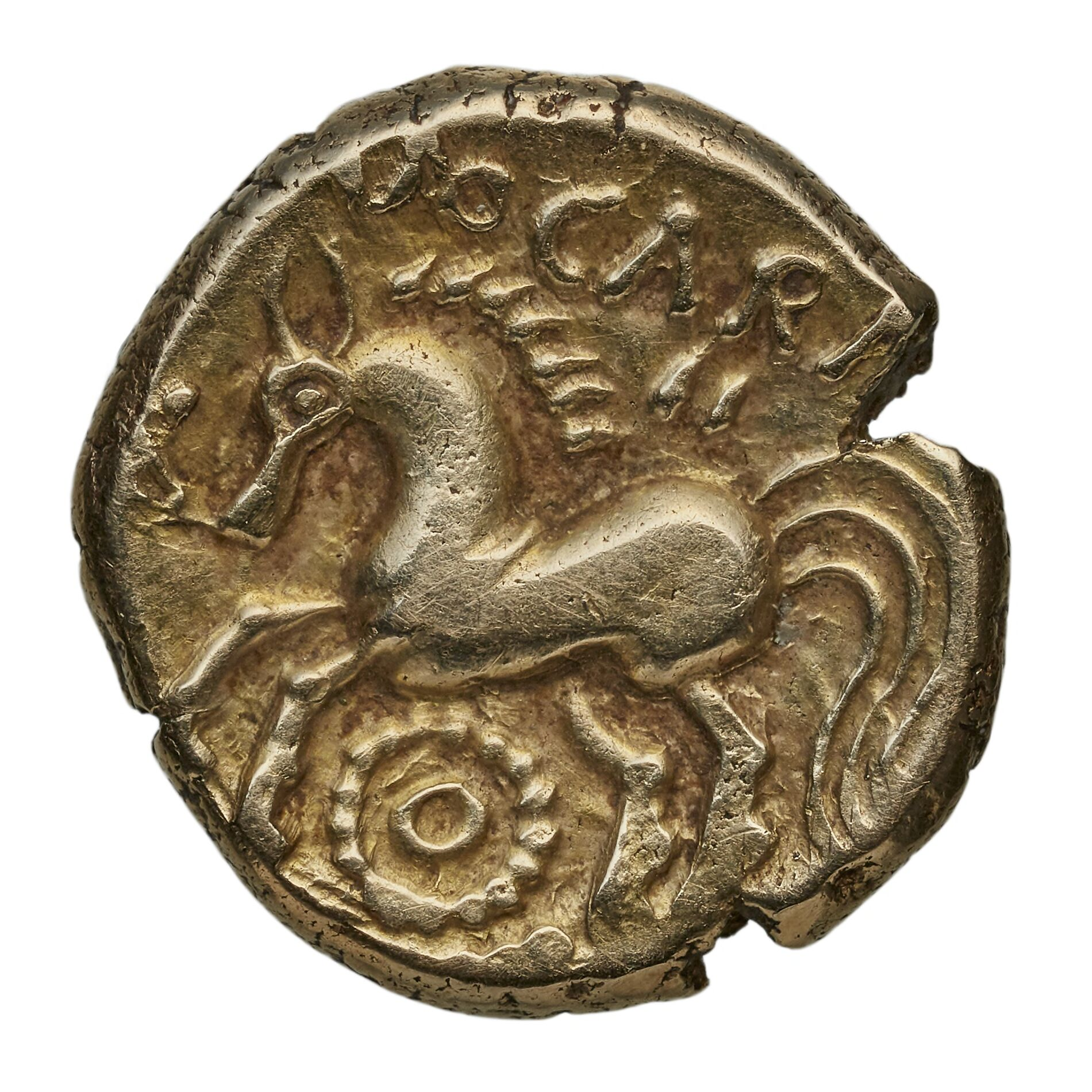
Gold stater of the Remi, with the legend VOCARAN on both sides: on the obverse, a deconstructed head projecting a giant eye; on the reverse, a triple-tail horse straddling a concentric ring design
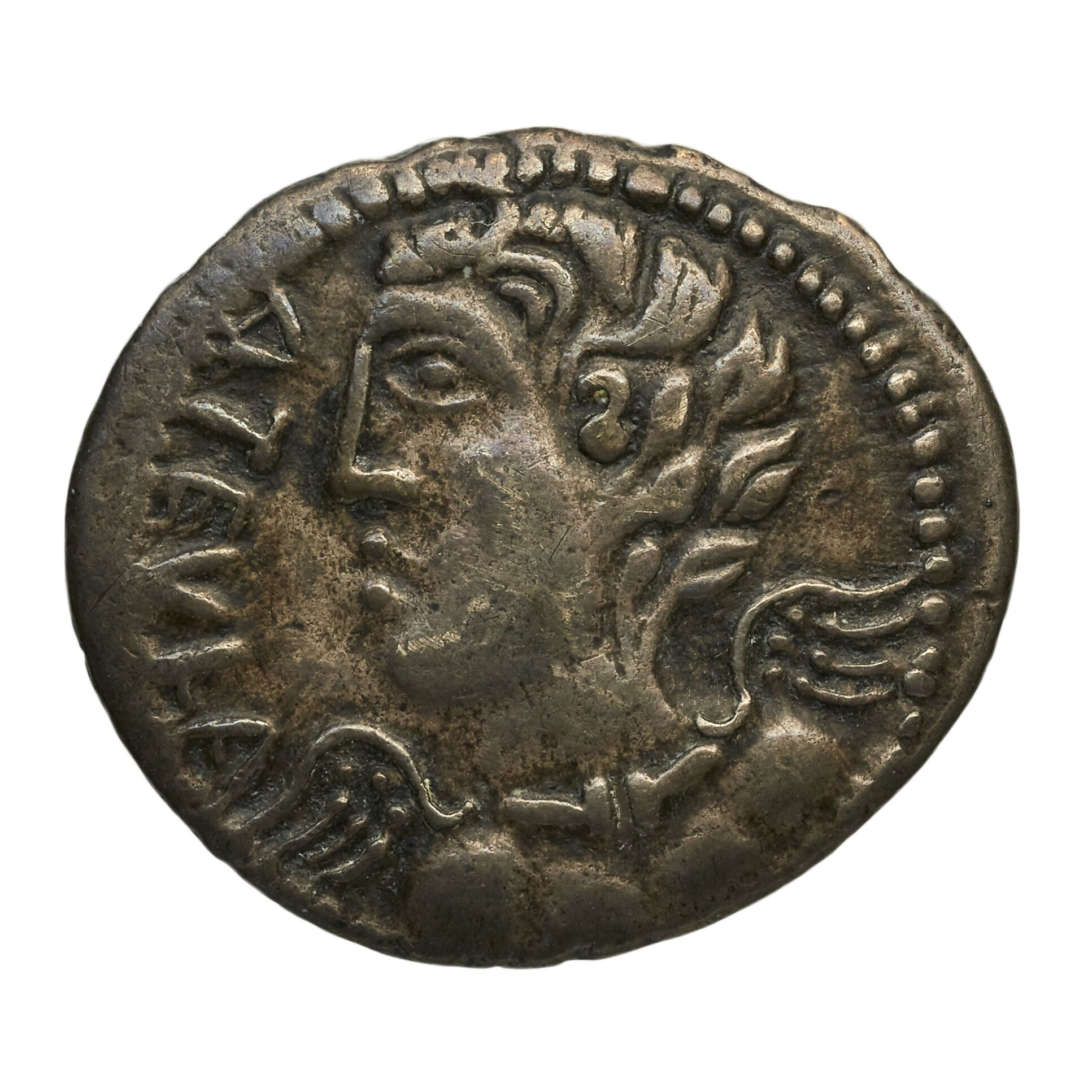
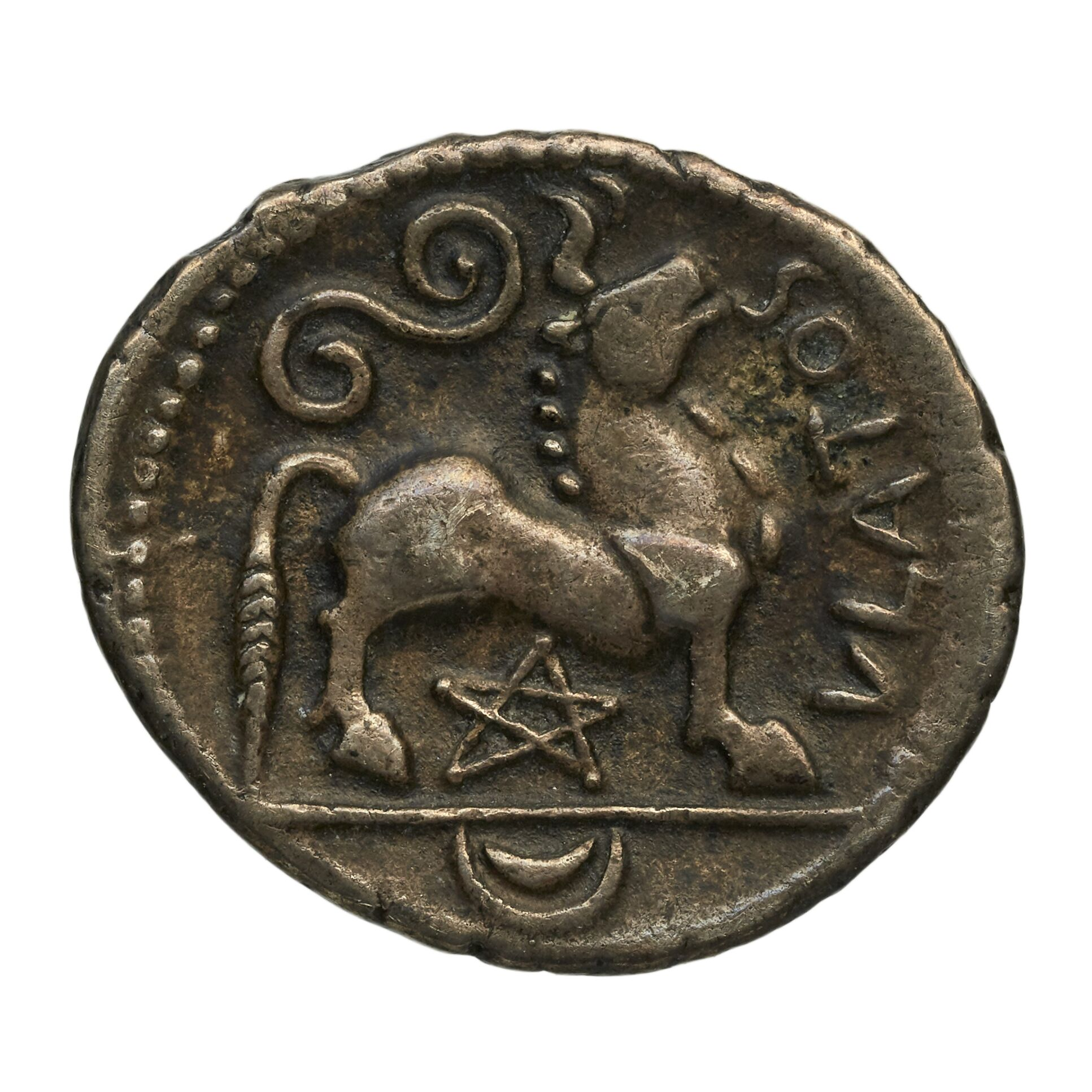
Silver coin with the personal name ATEVLA, featuring a torc-wearing winged bust on the obverse; on the reverse, a crescent moon in the exergue, and a horse lifting its head as if to neigh the name VLATOS, with an S-spiral above and a pentagram below

According to archaeologist Jean-Louis Brunaux, large-scale migrations occurred in the northern part of Gaul in the late 4th–early 3rd century BC, which may correspond to the coming of the Belgae. However, those cultural changes emerged later among the Remi: whereas new funerary customs (from burial to cremation) are noticeable from 250 to 200 BC onward on the territories of the Ambi or Bellovaci, incineration did not occur before 200–150 in the Aisne valley. As such, the Remi were probably not regarded as culturally integrated to the Belgae at the time of Caesar's conquest of the region.

By the mid-1st century BC, the Remi already possessed a structured economic system with monetary issuance, since they had prospered from their local agricultural production and from trade between northern Gaul and the Mediterranean area. After a period of regression in the 4th–3rd century, trade relations eventually recovered and gained in intensity during the second part of the 2nd century. A local landed nobility founded on agricultural and mining possessions subsequently emerged in the Aisne valley, and the Remi elite came to be influenced by the Latin culture through contacts with Roman merchants. Wine, in particular, was imported in large quantity from southern Europe by the local Remi elite before the Roman conquest.

=== Gallic Wars ===
During the Gallic Wars (58–50 BC), under the leadership of Iccius and Andecombogius, the Remi allied themselves with Julius Caesar:

The Remi, the Belgic tribe nearest to Gaul, sent as deputies to him Iccius and Andecumborius, the first men of the community, to tell him that they surrendered themselves and all their stuff to the protection and power of Rome; that they had neither taken part with the rest of the Belgae, nor conspired against Rome; and that they were ready to give hostages, to do his commands, to receive him in their towns, and to assist him with corn and everything else. All the rest of the Belgae, they said, were under arms, and the Germans dwelling on the hither side of the Rhine had joined with them; and the infatuation of them all was so great that the Remi had not been able to dissuade even the Suessiones from taking part with them, though these were their own brethren and kinsfolk, observing the same law and ordinances, and sharing one government, one ruler with themselves.

— Caesar 1917, p. 93 = Bello Gallico, 2.3.

They maintained their loyalty to Rome throughout the entire war, and were one of the few Gallic polities not to join in the rebellion of Vercingetorix.

When the Belgae besieged the oppidum of Bibrax (Saint-Thomas), defended by the Remi and their leader Iccius at the Battle of the Axona (57 BC), Caesar sent Numidian, Cretan and Balearic soldiers to avoid the seizure of the stronghold.

=== Roman period ===
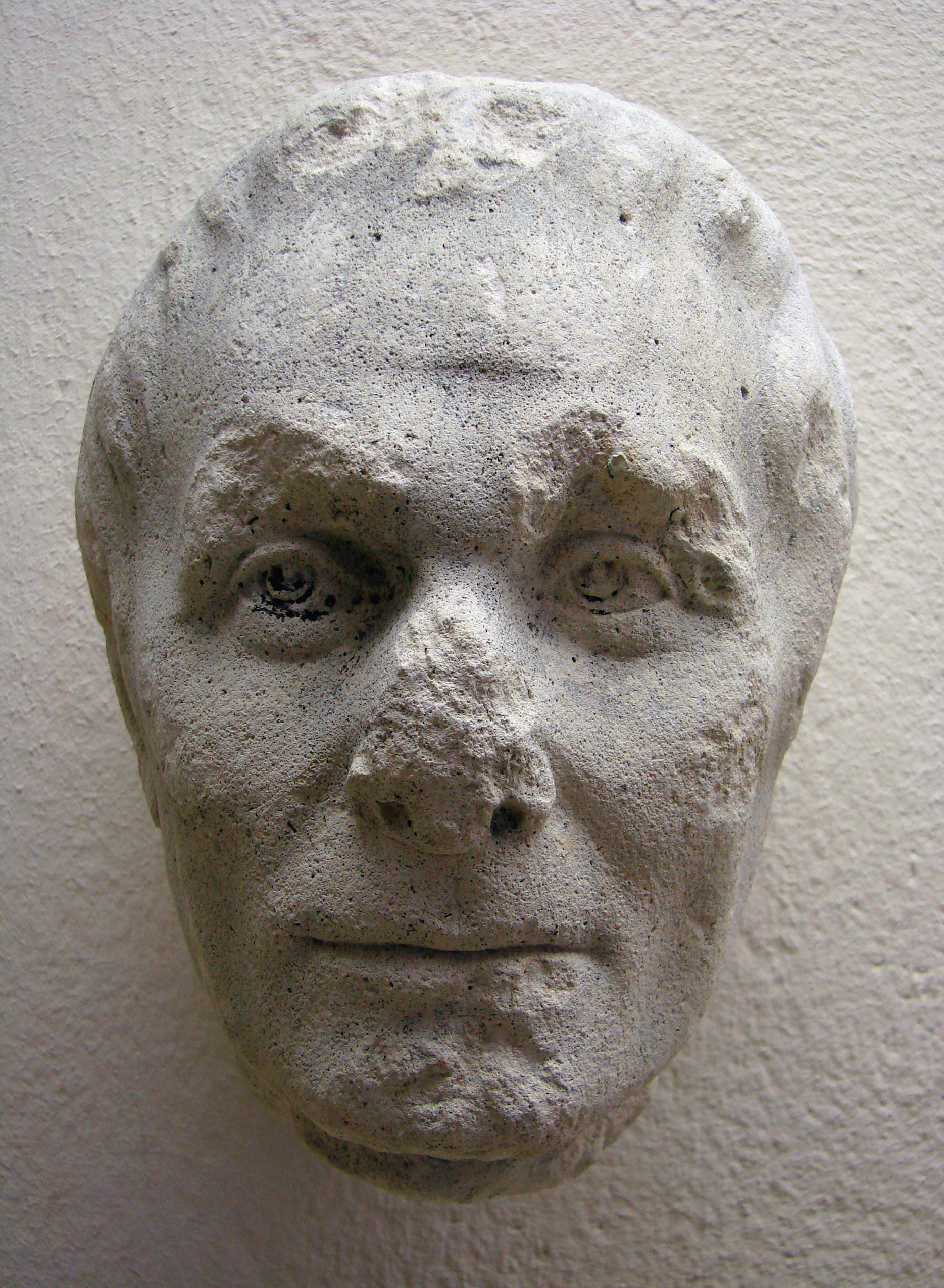
Portrait of a Remi citizen. 1st c. AD.

A founding myth preserved or invented by Flodoard of Reims (d. 966) makes Remus, brother of Romulus, the eponymous founder of the Remi, having escaped their fraternal rivalry instead of dying in Latium.

== Political organization ==
Until the Gallic Wars (58–50 BC), the Remi shared a common cultural identity with the neighbouring Suessiones, with whom with they were linked by the same law, the same magistrates and a unified commander-in-chief. In reality, this virtual state of union between the two tribes probably leaned in favour of the Suessiones. When Caesar entered Gallia Belgica in 57 BC, the Remi asked the protection of the Romans, thus gaining independence from a possibly asymmetrical relationship.

== Economy ==
In the second part of the 2nd century BC, as the result of early trade contacts with the Mediterranean world, and encouraged by a political will to build economic relations with Rome, the Remi were the first people to issue coins in Gallia Belgica. Their oppida were responsible for the minting of coins in the late 2nd and early 1st centuries BC.

== Religion ==
Two pre-Roman sanctuaries located at La Soragne (Bâalons-Bouvellemont) and Flavier (Mouzon) attest the religious offering of miniature weapons. In another sanctuary (Nepellier, in Nanteuil-sur-Aisne) were found Celtic sun crosses, along with destroyed weapons, coins, and human remains. Nepellier dates back to 250–200 BC and continued to be used during the Roman period until its destruction in Late Antiquity.

During the Roman period, Mars Camulus was probably the principal god of the Remi. Gallo-Roman sanctuaries are attested at Nizy-le-Comte, Versigny, and Sissonne. A statuette of Jupiter with a wheel was found in Landouzy-la-Ville. Although it features distinct Gallic characteristics, the inscription honours the Roman god Jupiter and the Imperial numen. Another inscription from Nizy-le-Comte was dedicated to Apollo.

== See also ==
- List of peoples of Gaul
- List of Celtic tribes
