= List of members of the Argyll and Sutherland Highlanders =

This is a list of people who have served with the Argyll and Sutherland Highlanders, and includes their antecedents, the 91st (Princess Louise's Argyllshire) Regiment; the 93rd (Sutherland Highlanders) Regiment; The Argyll and Sutherland Highlanders of Canada; and the militia battalions.

Table of contents:
A B C D E F G H I J K L M N O P Q R S T U V W X Y Z
Without biographies • See also • References

== A ==
- Major John Thompson McKellar Anderson VC DSO (1918–1943)
- Sir Ian Fife Campbell Anstruther, of that Ilk, 8th Baronet of Balcaskie and 13th Baronet of Anstruther (1922–2007)
- General Charles George James Arbuthnot (1801-1870), colonel of the 91st Regiment.

== B ==
- John Anderson Barstow MC, (1893–1941)
- Lieutenant-Colonel Alexander Elder Beattie CMG CBE MC, (1888–1951)
- Major John Hay Beith, CBE MC, (1876–1952),
- Captain Claude Thomas Bissell, CC, FRSC, (1916–2000)
- Major William Davidson Bissett VC (1893–1971)
- Adam Black DCM (born 1898)
- Lieutenant General Sir Alexander Crawford Simpson Boswell KCB CBE DL, (1928-2021)
- Major-General James Robert Brunker, (1806-1869)
- John Crawford Buchan VC (1892-1918)
- Adam Busby (born 1948)

== C ==
- David Cameron, (born 1975)
- Major General David Tennant Cowan CB, CBE, DSO, MC, (1896 – 1983)
- 2Lt John Crawford Buchan VC (1892–1918)
- Lieutenant-Colonel Charles William Campbell, 9th Earl of Breadalbane and Holland MC, DL, JP' (1889–1959)
- General Duncan Campbell of Lochnell c1763-1837,
- Gavin Campbell, 1st Marquess of Breadalbane KG, PC, JP, DL (1851–1922),
- Captain Ian Campbell, 12th and 5th Duke of Argyll FRSA, (1937-2001)
- Brigadier Lorne MacLaine Campbell VC, DSO & Bar, OBE, TD, (1902-1991)
- Niall Diarmid Campbell, 10th and 3rd Duke of Argyll, (1872–1949)
- Brigadier General Alfred Edward John Cavendish CMG (1859-1943)
- Brigadier Henry James Douglas Clark, (1888-1978)
- Thomas Horatio Arthur Ernest Cochrane, 1st Baron Cochrane of Cults DL, JP, LLD, (1857–1951)
- Captain Sir Ivar Iain Colquhoun, 8th Baronet, JP, DL, (1916–2008)
- Gen. James Robertson Craufurd (1804-1888)
- Lieutenant Colonel Jock Cunningham (1902-1969). Spanish Civil War International Brigades

== D ==
- Colonel John McAusland Denny (1858–1922)
- Charles Davidson Dunbar, DCM, (1870–1939)
- Brig.-Maj. Archibald Campbell Douglas, 4th Baron Blythswood KCVO (1870–1929)
- Lance Corporal John Dunlay VC, (1831-1863)
- Lt-Col Raymond Durie of Durie, (1905–1999)

== E ==
- George Carlyle Emslie, Baron Emslie. PC, MBE, (1919-2002)
- Major John Francis Ashley Erskine, Lord Erskine GCSI, GCIE, (1895–1953)
- Walter John Francis Erskine, 12th Earl of Mar and 14th Earl of Kellie KT JP (1865–1955)

== F ==
- General John Fane, 11th Earl of Westmorland GCB, GCH, PC (1784–1859)

== G ==
- 2Lt James Hill Galt (born 1885)
- Major John Ingles Gilmour DSO MC, (1896-1928)
- Brigadier General Duncan John Glasfurd, (1873–1916)
- Major-General Walter Tuckfield Goldsworthy, (1837–1911)
- Ernest Gordon (1916–2002)
- Sir Charles Stephen Gore (1793-1869)
- Lieutenant General Andrew Sir Andrew John Noble Graham Bt CB CBE, (born 1956)
- Colonel Douglas Beresford Malise Ronald Graham, 5th Duke of Montrose KT, (1852–1925)
- Lieutenant Colonel Sir John Reginald Noble Graham, 3rd Baronet VC OBE, (1892–1980)
- Peter Grant VC, (1824–1868)
- Air Vice Marshal Alexander Gray CB, MC, RAF, (1896-1980)
- Lieutenant Colonel Jonny Gray (1962 - )
- Hon. Ronald Henry Fulke Greville, (1864–1908)
- Lieutenant Colonel Thomas Witheridge Gubb, (born 1908)

== H ==
- Captain David Sidney Hall
- James "Big Jim" Healy, (1898–1961)
- Acting Captain Arthur Henderson VC, MC, (1893–1917)
- Lieutenant General Sir David Henderson KCB, KCVO, DSO, LLD, (1862–1921)
- Captain Ian Henry David Henderson MC
- Alexander Forbes Hendry MC TD, (1908–1980)
- Major Jack Herbert (1908-1999)
- Lieutenant-Colonel Graham Seton Hutchison, (1890–1946)

== K ==
- Major-General Sir John Kennedy GBE CB CMG DSO, (1878-1948)

== L ==
- Pipe Major William Lawrie, (1881–1916)
- Lieutenant General Sir Henry Lowther Ewart Clark Leask KCB DSO OBE, (1913-2004)
- John Aidan Liddell VC, MC, (1888–1915)

== M ==
- William Sutherland Macdonald MC, MB, CHB, DPH]] (1897-1990)
- John Duncan Mackie CBE MC, (1887–1978)
- Captain Henry Maitland Macintosh, (1892-1918)
- Lt David Lowe MacIntyre VC, CB, (18 June 1895 – 31 July 1967)
- David MacKay VC, (1831-1880)
- Capt. Duncan Ronald Gordon Mackay. D.F.C. (k.1917)
- Lieutenant-Colonel John Frederick MacKay VC, (1873-1930)
- Colonel Charles Allan Maclean, CBE, MC, Croix de Guerre with palm, MA. (1892- )
- General Sir Gordon Holmes Alexander MacMillan, Lord MacMillan of MacMillan of Knap, KCB, KCVO, CBE, DSO, MC, (1897-1986)
- Lieutenant General Sir John Richard Alexander MacMillan KCB CBE (born 1932)
- Air Vice Marshal Sir Norman Duckworth Kerr MacEwen CB, CMG, DSO, RAF, (1881–1953)
- Captain George Fielden MacLeod, Baron MacLeod of Fuinary, MC, (1895–1991)
- Captain Dugald Malcolm, CMG CVO TD (born 1917)
- Major-General William McBean VC, (1818-1878)
- Air Vice-Marshal Andrew MacGregor, (1897-1983)
- Piper L/cpl James Mclean (1915-1984)
- Lt Col Colin Mitchell, (1925–1996)
- Major Kenneth Muir VC, (1912-1950)
- Colour-sergeant James Munro VC, (1826-1871)
- William Hutchison Murray, (1913–1996)

== N ==
- Captain Ian Patrick Robert Napier MC, (1895–1977)
- Francis James Patrick Lilley, (1907–1971)

== O ==
- Captain Charles Lindsay Orr-Ewing, (1860–1903)

== P ==
- General Sir Charles Patrick Ralph Palmer, KCVO, KBE,
- Sgt John Paton VC, (1833–1914)
- Richard Dunn Pattison, (1874–1916)
- Glencairn Balfour Paul CMG, (1917–2008)

== R ==
- Air Vice Marshal Sir George Ranald MacFarlane Reid KCB, DSO, MC, (1893–1991)
- Sir Norman Robert Reid, (1915–2007)
- Acting Sergeant John Rennie, GC, (1919–1943)
- Major Frederick Joseph Ricketts (21 February 1881 – 15 May 1945)
- Sir David Robertson, (1890–1970)
- Major General Horatio Gordon Robley, (1840–1930)
- Colonel Donald Grant Ross OBE

== S ==
- Vernon Scannell, (1922–2007)
- Col Sir (Michael) Hugh Shaw-Stewart, 8th Baronet (1854–1942)
- Brigadier I A Sim, CBE TD (died 14 December 2018)
- Colonel John Douglas Slim, 2nd Viscount Slim OBE, DL, FRGS (1927–2019)
- Major Gordon Smith (1920–2014)
- Sir William McNair Snadden, 1st Baronet JP (1896–1959)
- Victor Marlborough Silvester OBE (1900–1978)
- Finlay Ballantyne Speedie MM (1880–1953)
- Lt Col John David "Dave" Stewart DSO (1910–1988)
- Brig Ian Stewart (1895–1987)
- Maj George Stewart VC (February 1831 – 19 October 1868)
- 2Lt Walter Riddell Sutherland (1890–1918)

== T ==
- Brigadier Ronald John Frederick "Ronnie" Tod CBE, DSO, (1905–1975)
- Captain George Reid Thomson, Lord Thomson, (1893-1962)

== W ==
- Charles Laing Warr GCVO, (1892-1969)
- General Sir Arthur Grenfell Wauchope GCB GCMG CIE DSO, (1874–1947)
- Air Commodore James George Weir CBE CMG, (1887–1973)
- Major-General Sir Alexander Wilson KCB, (1858–1937)
- Patrick Wolrige-Gordon, (1935–2002)

== Y ==
- George Kenneth Hotson Younger, 4th Viscount Younger of Leckie KT KCVO TD PC, (1931-2003)
