= David S. Hall (RFC officer) =

David Sidney Hall
- Born: 1892; Grangemouth, Stirlingshire, Scotland
- Died: 20 November 1917 (aged 25); Les Alleux, France
- Burial place: Longuenesse Souvenir Cemetery, Saint-Omer, France; 50°43′45.6″N 2°15′00.7″E
- Military career
- Allegiance: United Kingdom
- Branch: British Army
- Service years: 1914–1917
- Rank: Captain
- Units: Highland Light Infantry; Argyll & Sutherland Highlanders; No. 57 Squadron RFC
- Conflicts: World War I • Western Front
- Awards: Military Cross

Captain David Sidney Hall MC (1892 – 20 November 1917) was a Scottish World War I flying ace credited with six aerial victories.

== Biography ==
Hall was born in Grangemouth, the youngest son of William Hall of Helensburgh. He was educated at the Hermitage School, Dunoon Grammar School, and Hillhead High School, Glasgow, after which he worked in the office of the chartered accountants Paterson & Benzie. In October 1914 he enlisted into the 17th (Glasgow Commercials) Battalion, Highland Light Infantry, as a private. He was commissioned as a second lieutenant in the 9th (The Dumbartonshire) Battalion of the Princess Louise's (Argyll and Sutherland Highlanders) regiment on 17 April 1915, and was sent to France in July.

Hall was seconded to the Royal Flying Corps with the rank of lieutenant on 1 December 1916. After completing his pilot training he was posted to No. 57 Squadron in France, flying the DH.4 two-seater day bomber.

He was appointed a flight commander with the acting-rank of captain on 18 June 1917. On 27 July he and observer/gunner 2nd Lieutenant N. M. Pizey drove down an Albatros D.V out of control over Houthulst Forest, though Pizey was killed in the action. Hall was then paired with Lieutenant Britton, who was wounded by "friendly fire" from a French SPAD over Ypres on 20 August.

On 2 October, Hall, with 2nd Lieutenant Edward Patrick Hartigan, led a flight of five DH.4s on a bombing attack on the enemy aerodrome at Abeele. On their return they were attacked by Albatros D.V fighters over Roeselare. In the "confused" action that followed Hall and Hartigan claimed four D.Vs shot down, and probable hits on at least six others. Two DH.4s were shot down and their crews killed, and a third crash-landed in enemy territory, killing the observer, while the pilot was captured.

On 26 November, following this action, Hall was awarded the Military Cross. His citation read:

Lieutenant (Temporary Captain) David Sidney Hall, Argyll and Sutherland Highlanders, and Royal Flying Corps.

"For conspicuous gallantry and devotion to duty. While leading back his formation of five machines from a bombing raid he was attacked on eight different occasions by numerous enemy scouts. He himself shot down one in flames and another out of control, while his observer shot down two in flames. He has at all times, completed the task allotted to him, and set a splendid example."

Hall and Hartigan drove down another D.V on 28 October, west of Roeselare. On the morning of 20 November, the first day of the battle of Cambrai, they set off alone on a weather reconnaissance mission, but did not return. The wreckage of their aircraft was discovered later in the day near Les Alleux, Ardennes.

Hall and Hartigan are buried together in the Longuenesse Souvenir Cemetery at Saint-Omer, France.

== See also ==
- List of World War I aces credited with 6 victories
- Notable members of the Argyll and Sutherland Highlanders
