= Bibrax =

Gallic oppidum

Coordinates: 49.5°N 3.82°E

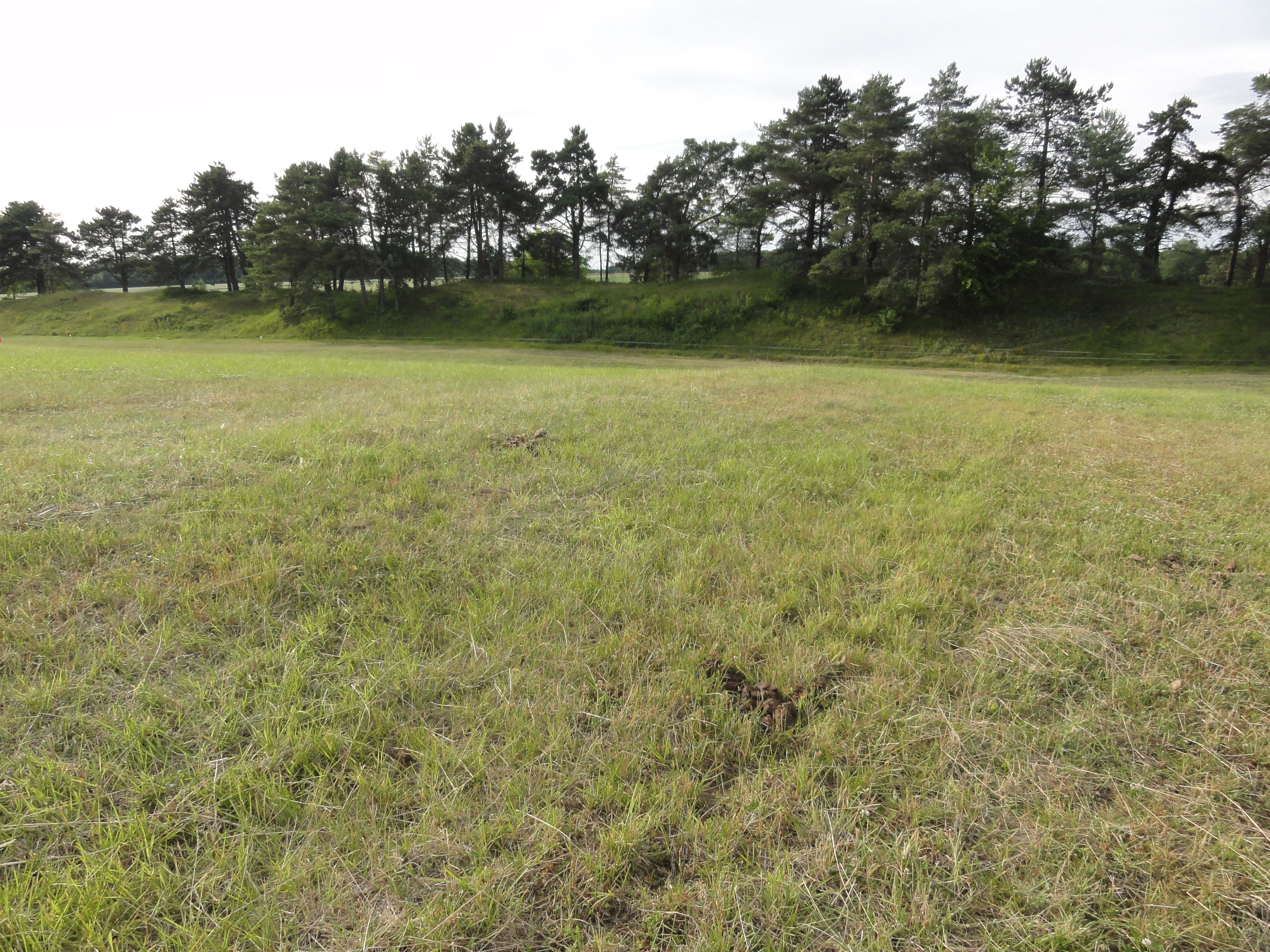
Roman camp with Gallic wall at Saint-Thomas (Aisne).

Bibrax is a Gallic oppidum (fortified settlement). Its position has long been debated, but the oppidum is now almost certainly identified with the site of Saint-Thomas (Aisne).

== History ==
The oppidum, occupied by the Remi and their leader Iccius, was besieged by the Belgae armies during the Battle of the Axona (57 BC). Julius Caesar rescued his allied people, the Remi, by sending Numidian, Cretan and Balearic soldiers to the stronghold.
