= Les Alleux =

- Part of Bairon et ses environs
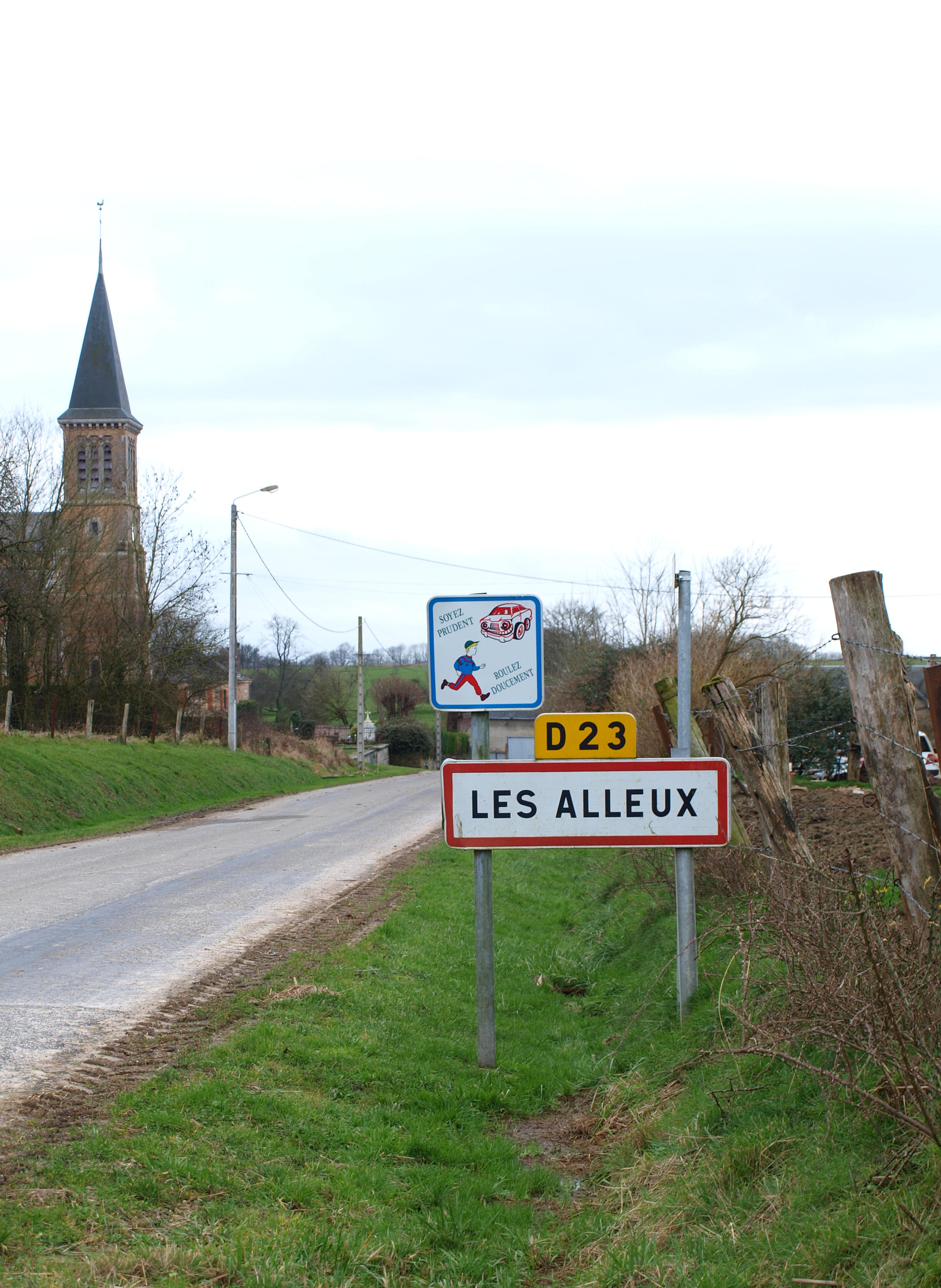
- The entrance to the village

- Coat of arms
- Location of Les Alleux
- Location within France Location within Grand Est
- Coordinates: 49°28′17″N 4°44′20″E
- Country: France
- Region: Grand Est
- Department: Ardennes
- Arrondissement: Vouziers
- Canton: Vouziers
- Commune: Bairon et ses environs
- Area^{1}: 12.04 km^{2} (4.65 sq mi)
- Elevation: 207 m (679 ft)
- Highest elevation: 209 m (686 ft)
- Lowest elevation: 133 m (436 ft)
- Population (2021): 77
  - Density: 6.4/km^{2} (17/sq mi)
- Time zone: UTC+01:00 (CET)
  - Summer (DST): UTC+02:00 (CEST)
- Postal code: 08400
- ^{1} French Land Register data, which excludes lakes, ponds, glaciers > 1 km^{2} (0.386 sq mi or 247 acres) and river estuaries.

Les Alleux (French pronunciation: [lez‿alø]) is a former commune in the Ardennes department in northern France. On 1 January 2016, it was merged into the new commune Bairon et ses environs.

== Geography ==
Les Alleux is some 30 km (19 mi) east of Rethel and 10 km (6.2 mi) north of Vouziers. The commune can be accessed by the D977 road from Vouziers in the south passing through the commune to the east of the village and continuing to Le Chesne in the north. Access to the village is by the D23 road from Voncq in the west and continuing north to join the D977 inside the commune. Most of the east and west of the commune are forested with the central part farmland.

An unnamed stream rises south of the village and flows north-west to join the Ruisseau des Graquinettes just west of the commune.

=== Neighbouring communes and villages ===
Source:

== Heraldry ==
Arms of Les Alleux	Blazon: Gules, a chevron of Or accompanied in chief by two arrows of Argent in pale and in base by a crescent the same; in chief overall Azure charged with three mullets of Or.

== Administration ==
List of Successive Mayors

From	To	Name
1995	2001	Francis Ledig
2001	2014	Joël Gobert
2014	2016	Guillaume Queval

== Demography ==
The inhabitants of the commune are known as Alleusiens or Alleusiennes, or alternatively Alleutiers or Alleutières in French.

Historical population

Year	Pop.	±% p.a.
1793	231	—
1800	315	+4.53%
1806	317	+0.11%
1821	335	+0.37%
1831	408	+1.99%
1836	437	+1.38%
1841	442	+0.23%
1846	433	−0.41%
1851	425	−0.37%
1866	407	−0.29%
1872	460	+2.06%
1876	427	−1.84%
1881	425	−0.09%
1886	417	−0.38%
1891	361	−2.84%
1896	387	+1.40%

Year	Pop.	±% p.a.
1901	376	−0.58%
1906	334	−2.34%
1911	288	−2.92%
1921	231	−2.18%
1926	201	−2.74%
1931	214	+1.26%
1936	160	−5.65%
1946	170	+0.61%
1954	167	−0.22%
1962	166	−0.08%
1968	125	−4.62%
1975	102	−2.86%
1982	69	−5.43%
1990	72	+0.53%
1999	63	−1.47%
2021	77	+0.92%

Source: EHESS and INSEE

== French Decorations ==
- Croix de Guerre 1914-1918: 9 March 1921

== Sites and Monuments ==
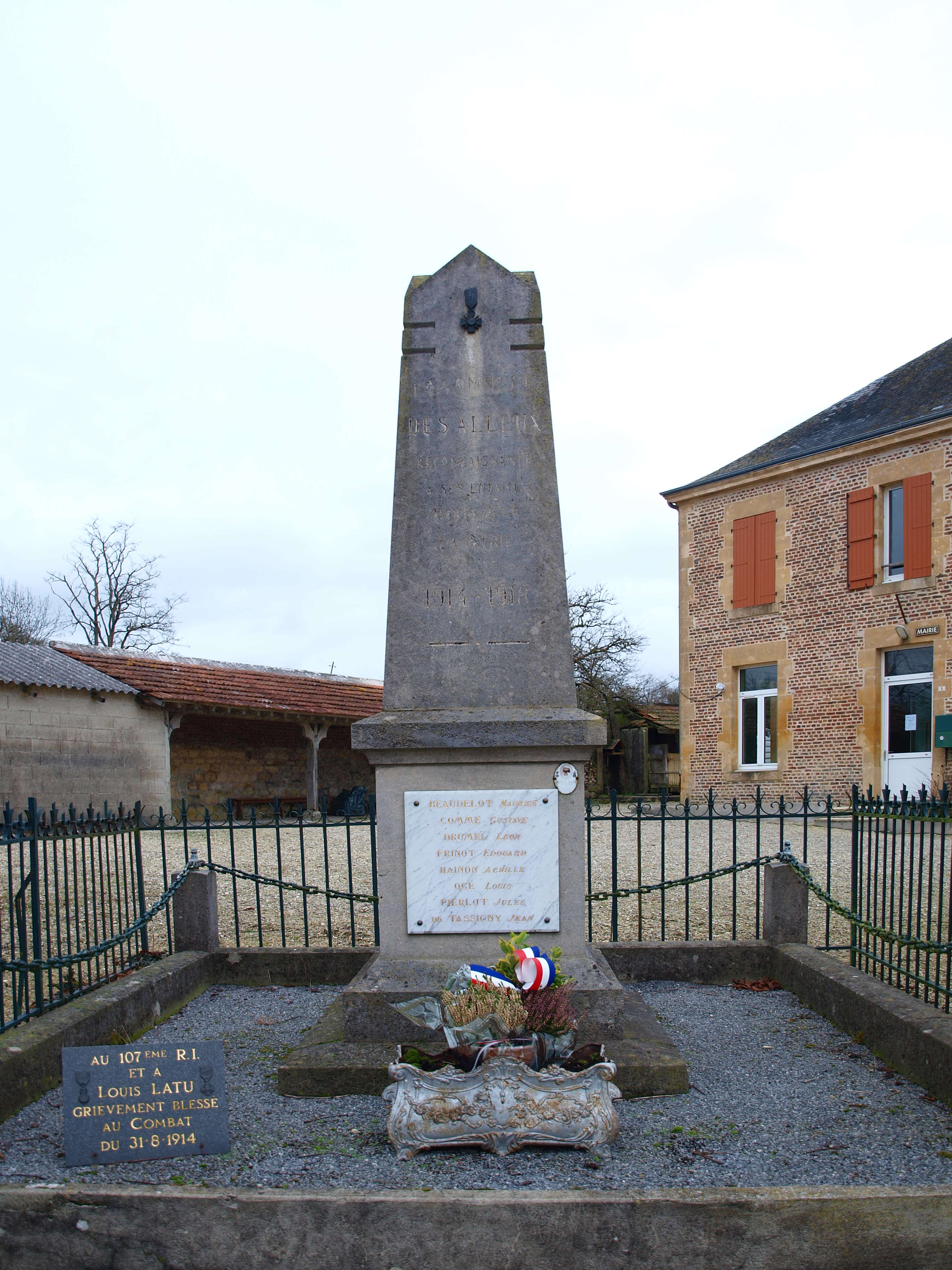
The War Memorial

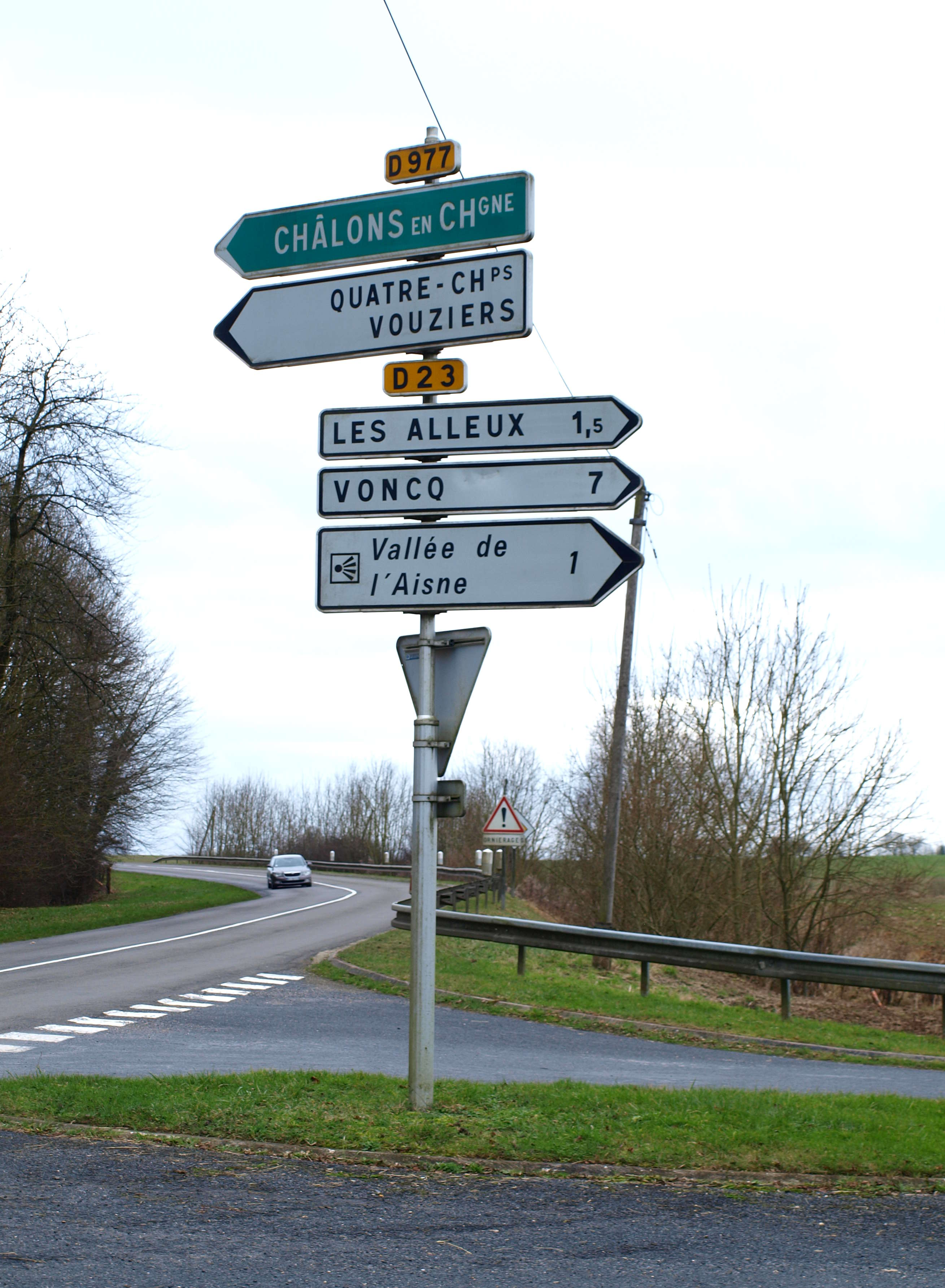
The crossroads of the D977 and the D23

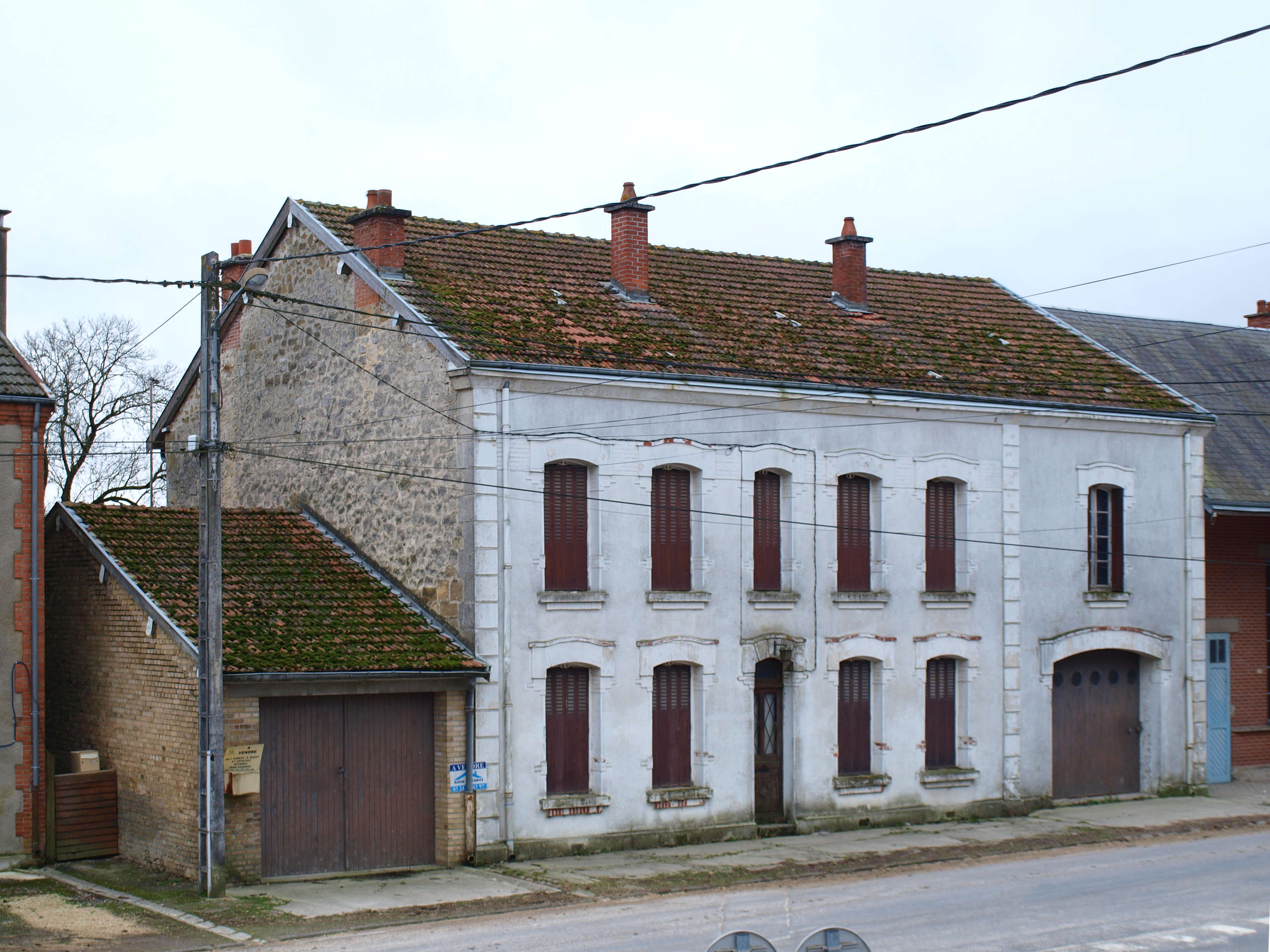
A house in Les Alleux

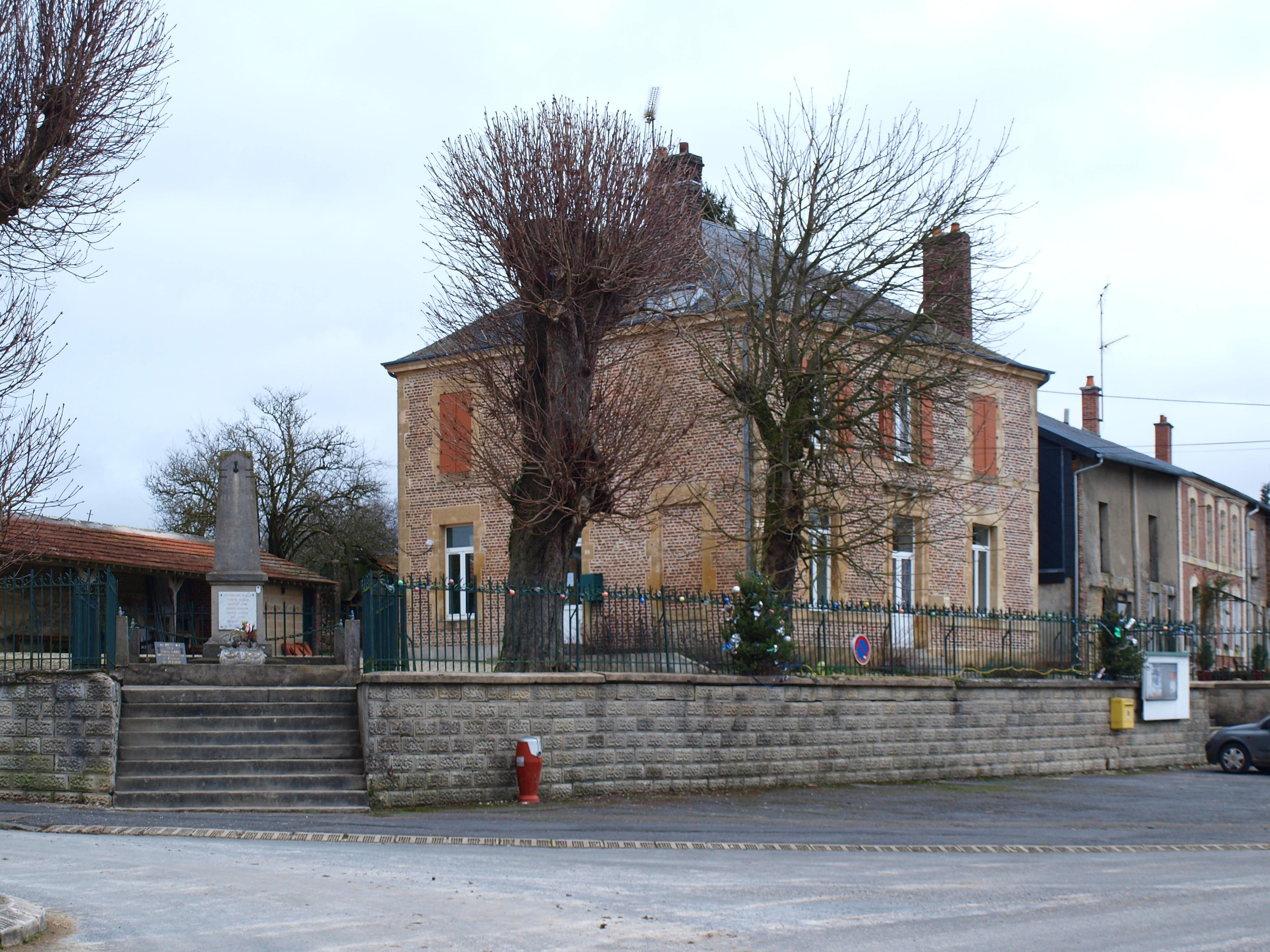
The Town Hall

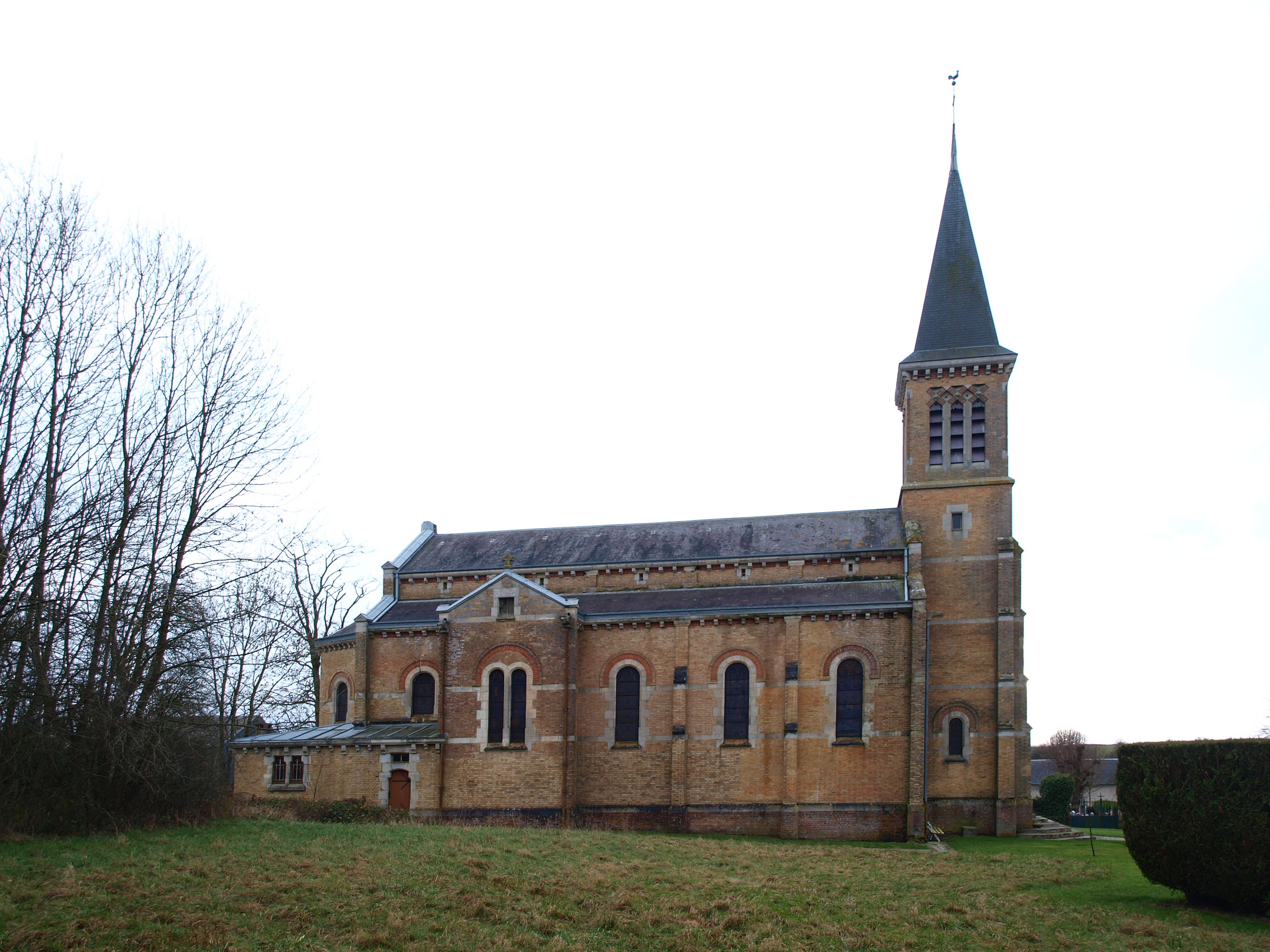
The Church of Alleux

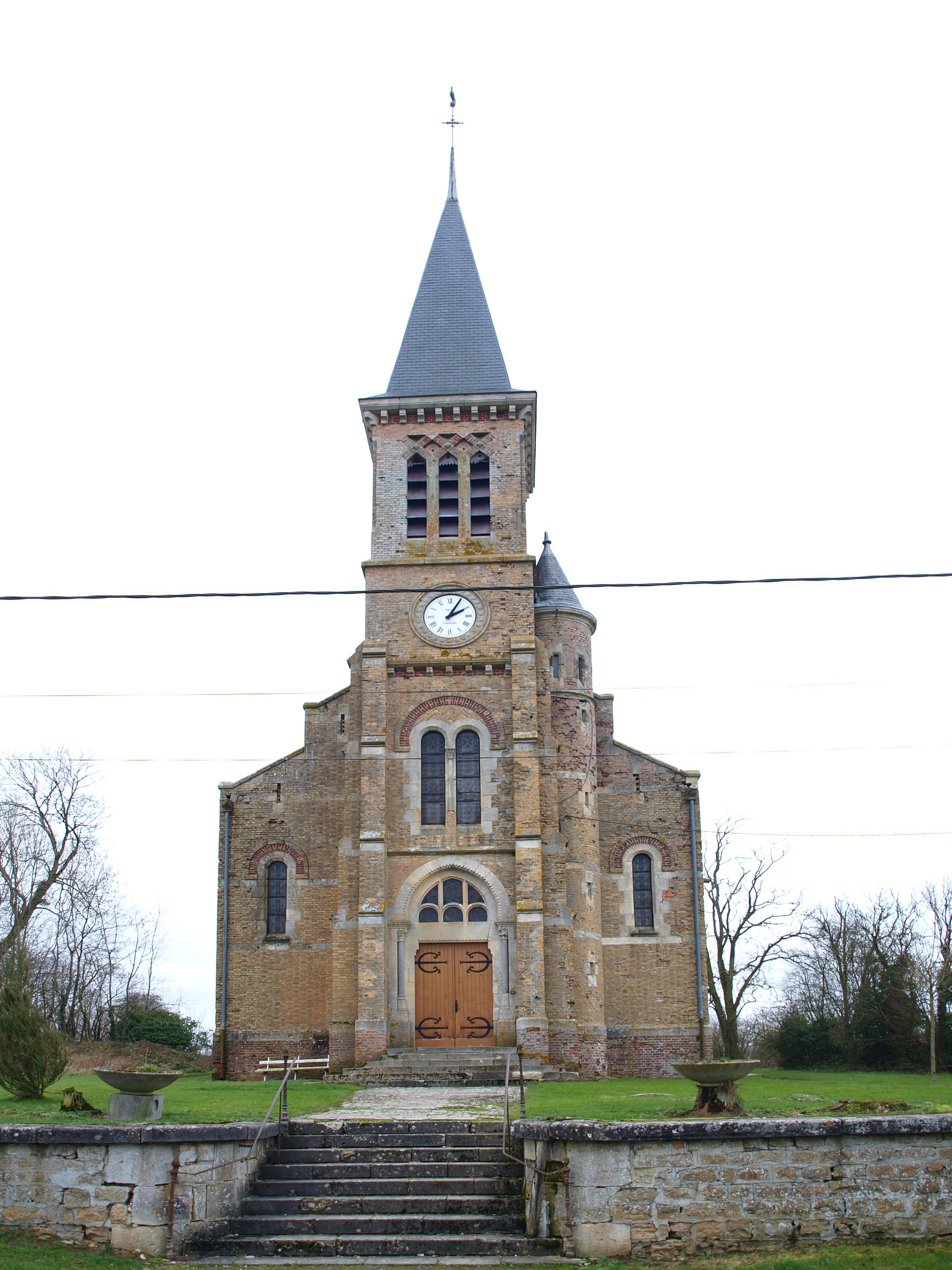
The entrance to the church

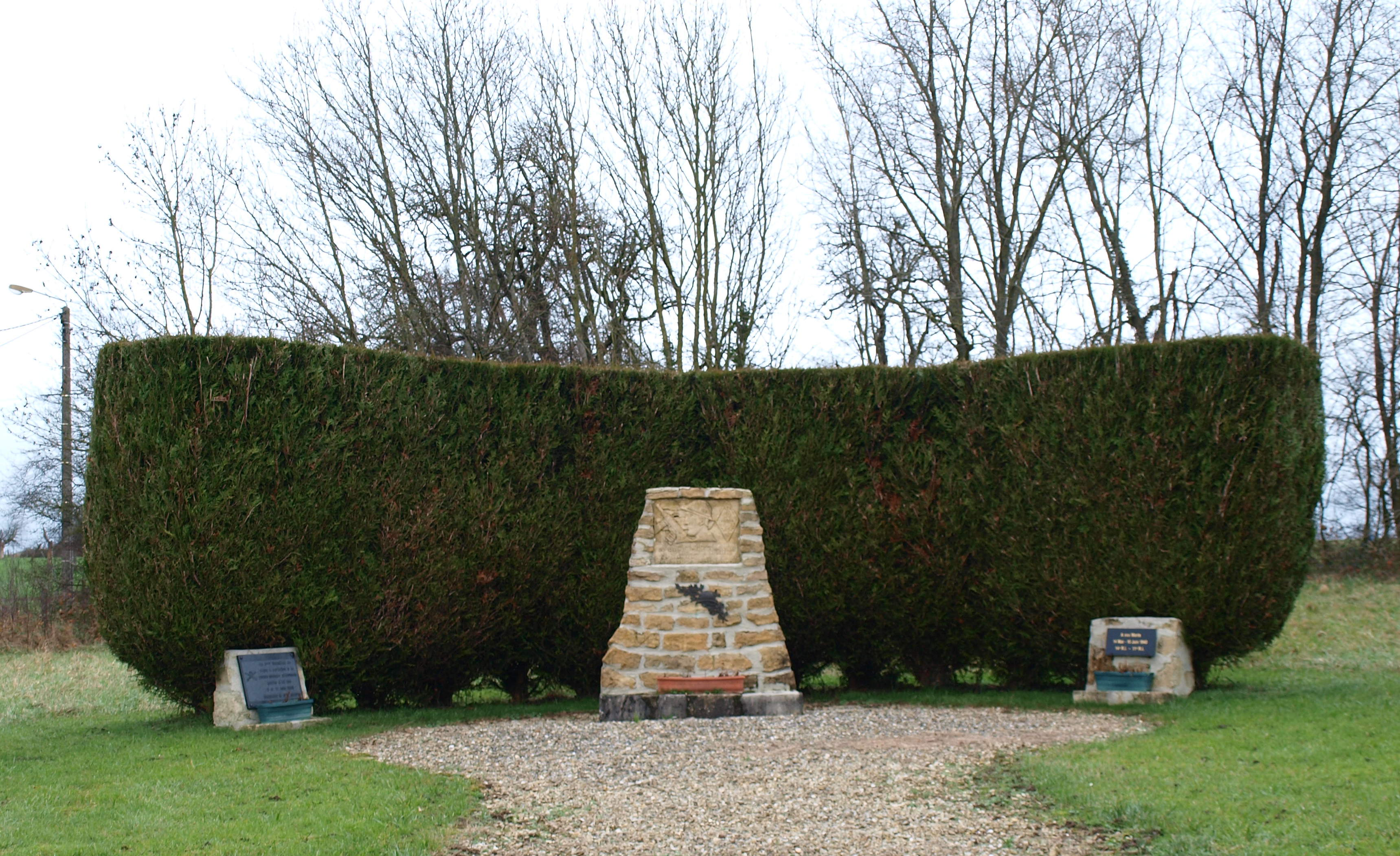
Memorial to June 1940

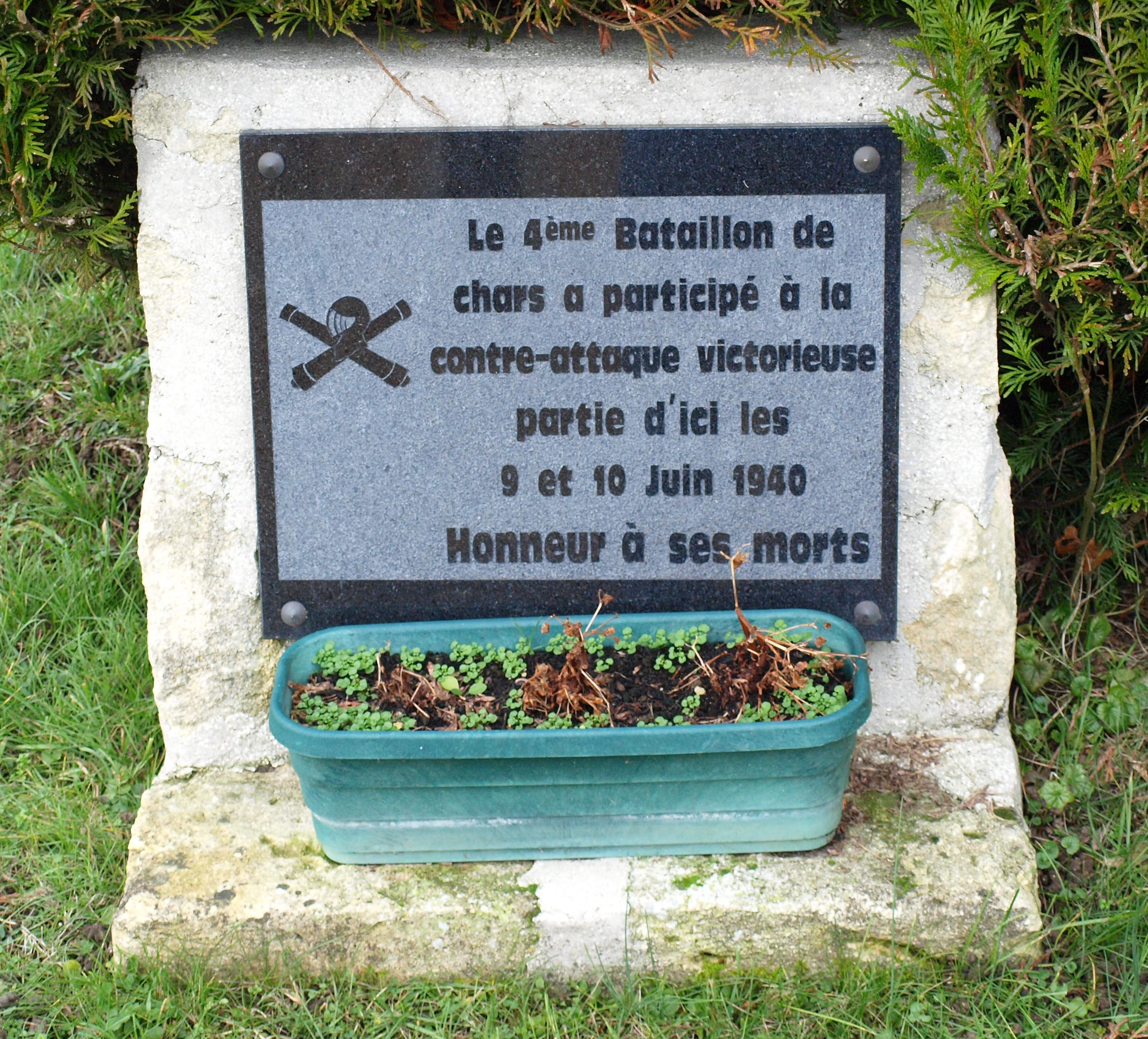
Memorial to the counter-offensive of 9–10 June 1940

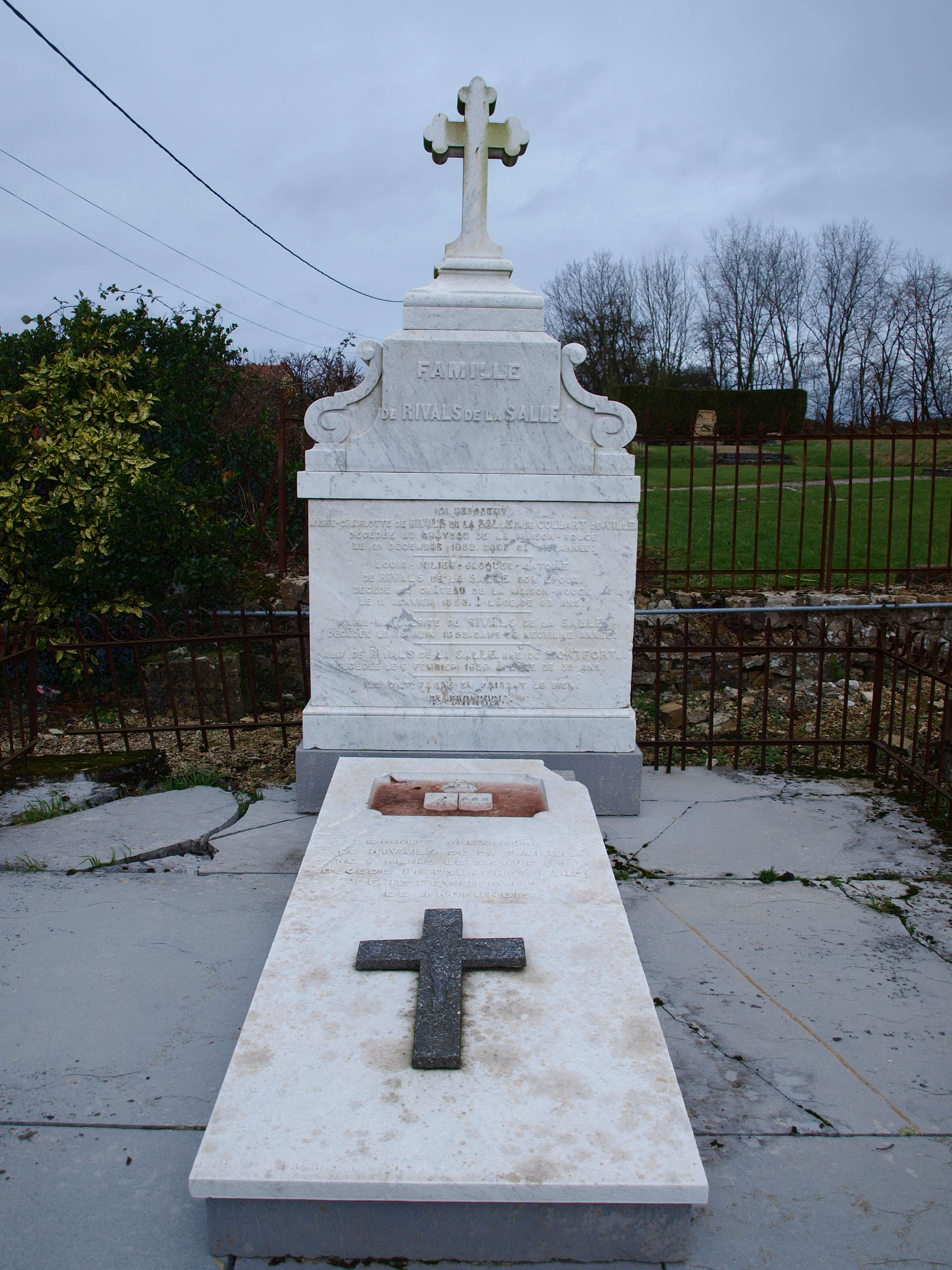
Tomb of the Rivals de la Salle family, owners of the Chateau of Maison-Rouge in 1853

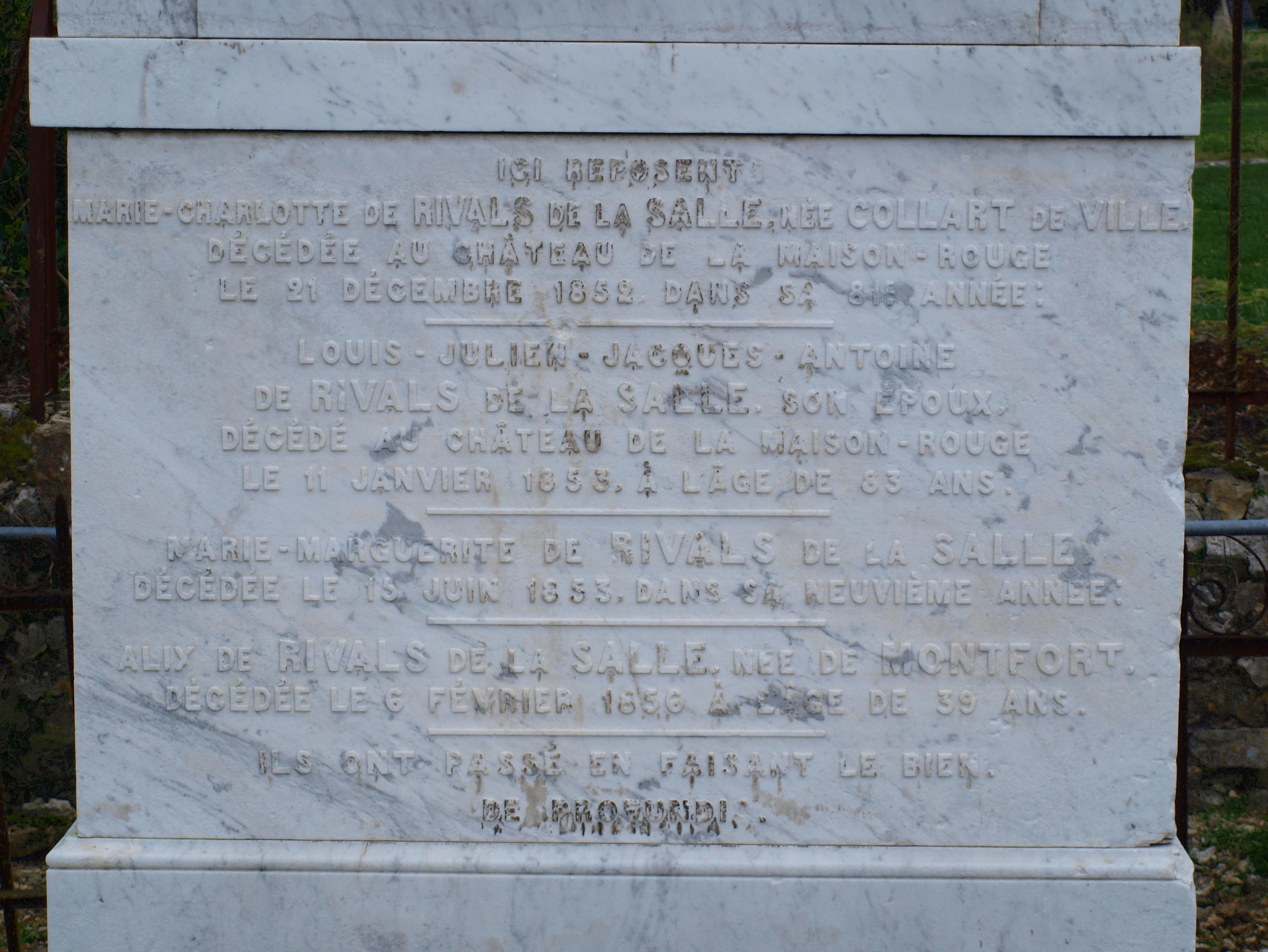
Tomb of the Rivals de la Salle family detail

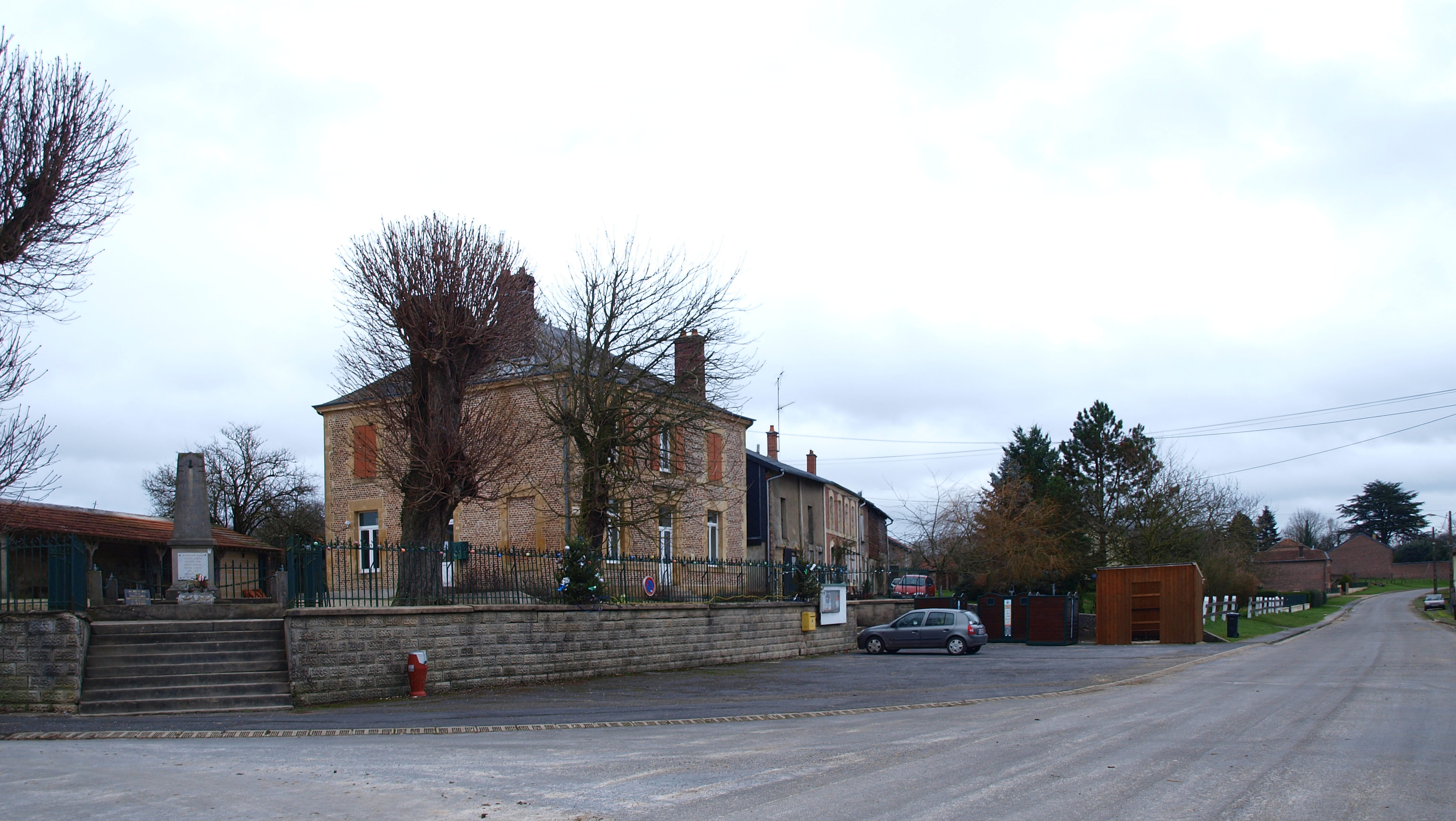
The road to Vouziers

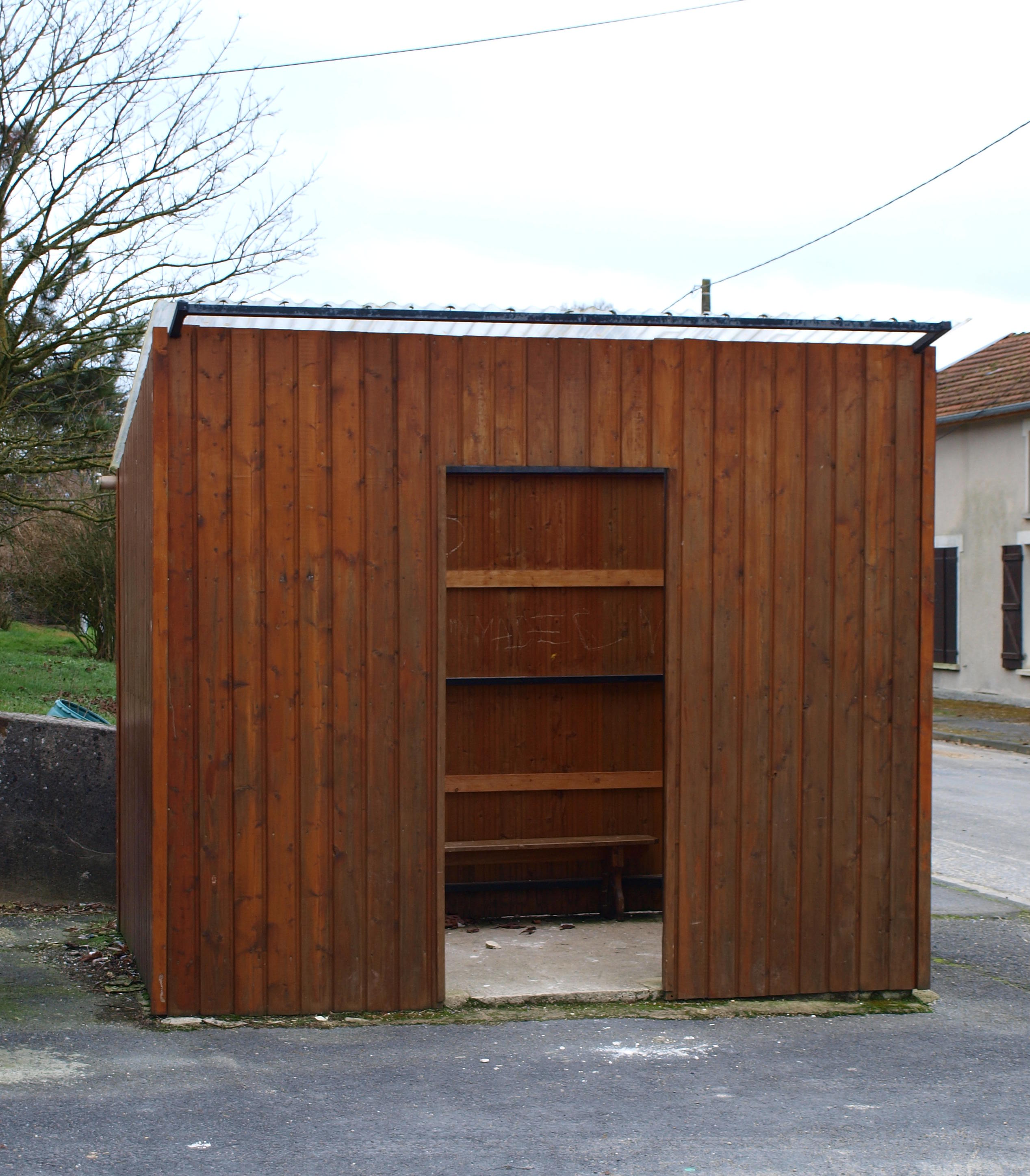
The bus shleter for the Abribus

== Notable people linked to the commune ==
- Tristan de Villelongue (1562-1631) was a doctor of theology, councillor of state and a preacher for Henry IV

== See also ==
- Communes of the Ardennes department

=== External links ===
- Les Alleux on the old National Geographic Institute website (in French)
- Les Alleux on the 1750 Cassini Map
