= Louvergny =

- Part of Bairon et ses environs
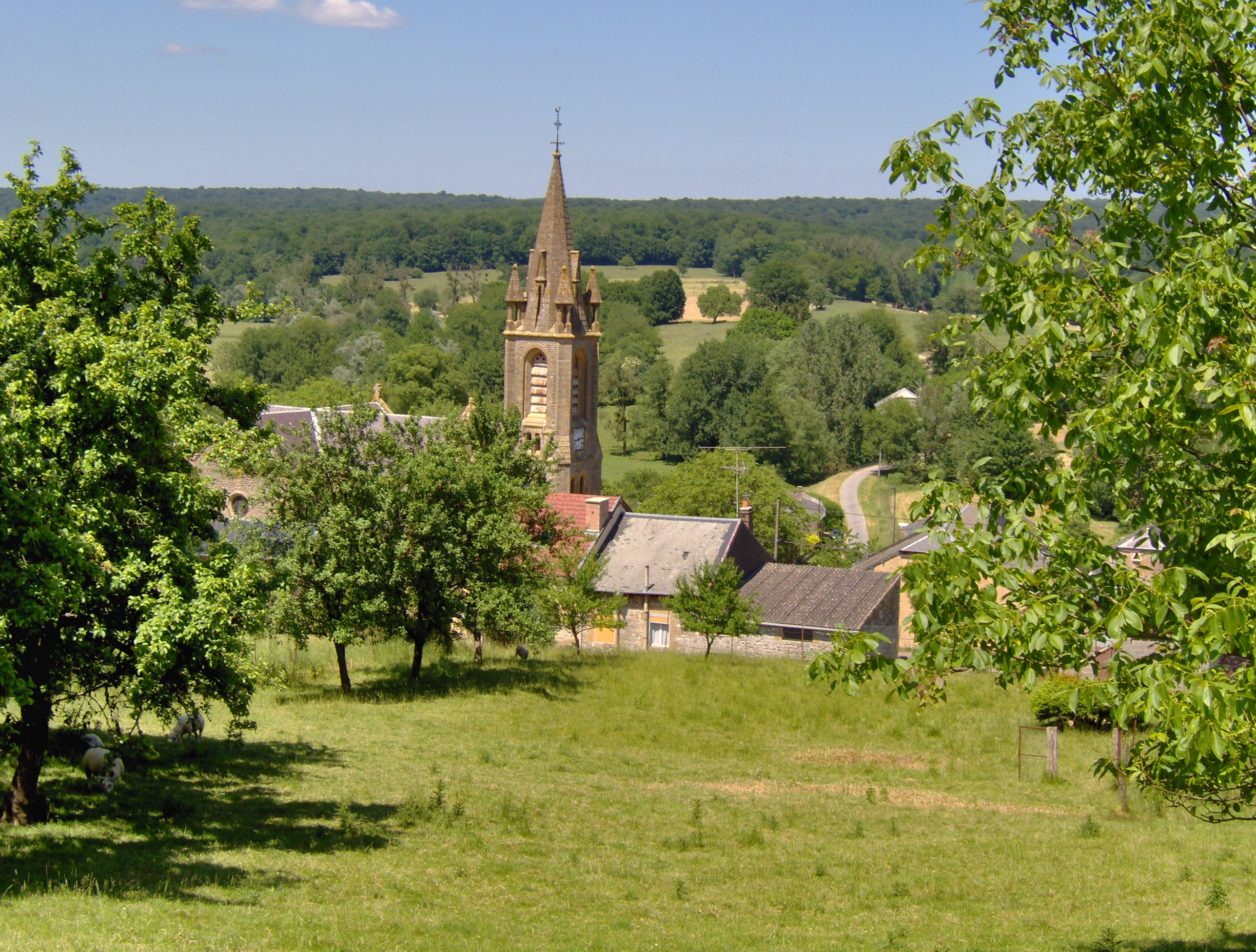

- Coat of arms
- Location of Louvergny
- Location within France Location within Grand Est
- Coordinates: 49°33′10″N 4°44′25″E
- Country: France
- Region: Grand Est
- Department: Ardennes
- Arrondissement: Vouziers
- Canton: Vouziers
- Commune: Bairon et ses environs
- Area^{1}: 8.95 km^{2} (3.46 sq mi)
- Elevation: 220 m (720 ft)
- Highest elevation: 249 m (817 ft)
- Lowest elevation: 172 m (564 ft)
- Population (2021): 65
  - Density: 7.3/km^{2} (19/sq mi)
- Time zone: UTC+01:00 (CET)
  - Summer (DST): UTC+02:00 (CEST)
- Postal code: 08390
- ^{1} French Land Register data, which excludes lakes, ponds, glaciers > 1 km^{2} (0.386 sq mi or 247 acres) and river estuaries.

Louvergny (French pronunciation: [luvɛʁɲi]) is a former commune in the Ardennes department in northern France. On 1 January 2016, it was merged into the new commune Bairon et ses environs. The inhabitants are called Marinettes in French.

== Geography ==
Louvergny is mostly situated on the southern bank of the Ruisseau des Prés, which flows into the Lake of Bairon.

== See also ==
- Communes of the Ardennes department
