= Bairon et ses environs =

- Commune
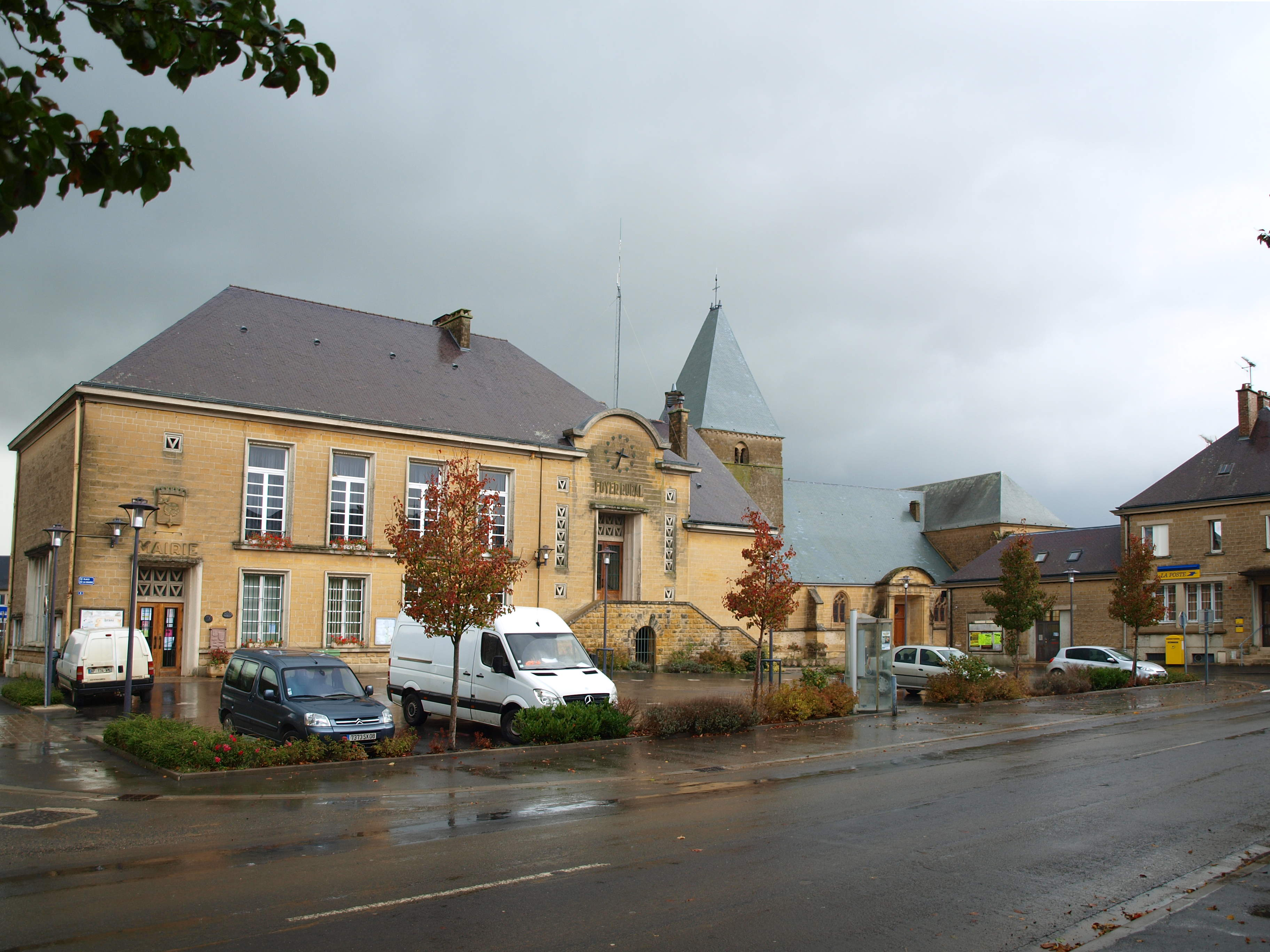
- The town hall in Le Chesne
- Location of Bairon et ses environs
- Location within France Location within Grand Est
- Coordinates: 49°30′50″N 4°45′54″E
- Country: France
- Region: Grand Est
- Department: Ardennes
- Arrondissement: Vouziers
- Canton: Vouziers

Government
  - Mayor (2020–2026): Benoît Singlit
- Area^{1}: 44.86 km^{2} (17.32 sq mi)
- Population (2023): 1,037
  - Density: 23.12/km^{2} (59.87/sq mi)
- Time zone: UTC+01:00 (CET)
  - Summer (DST): UTC+02:00 (CEST)
- INSEE/Postal code: 08116 /08390
- ^{1} French Land Register data, which excludes lakes, ponds, glaciers > 1 km^{2} (0.386 sq mi or 247 acres) and river estuaries.

Bairon et ses environs (French pronunciation: [bɛʁɔ̃ e sez‿ɑ̃viʁɔ̃], lit. 'Bairon and its surroundings') is a commune in the Ardennes department of northern France. The municipality was established on 1 January 2016 and consists of the former communes of Le Chesne, Les Alleux and Louvergny.

== See also ==
- Communes of the Ardennes department
