= Nizy-le-Comte =

- Commune
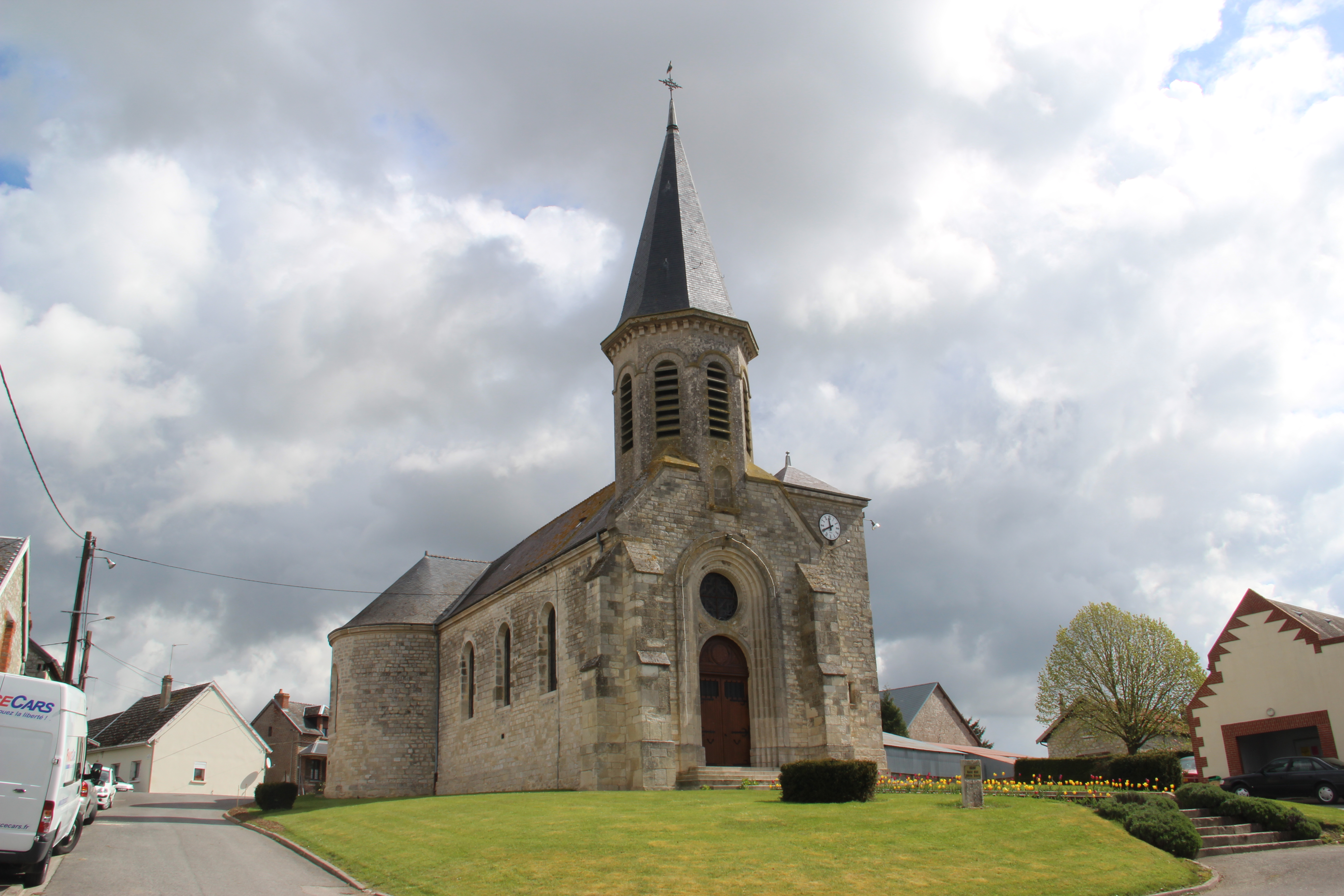
- The church of Nizy-le-Comte
- Location of Nizy-le-Comte
- Location within France Location within Hauts-de-France
- Coordinates: 49°34′10″N 4°03′20″E
- Country: France
- Region: Hauts-de-France
- Department: Aisne
- Arrondissement: Laon
- Canton: Villeneuve-sur-Aisne
- Intercommunality: Champagne Picarde

Government
  - Mayor (2020–2026): Hubert Renard
- Area^{1}: 31.53 km^{2} (12.17 sq mi)
- Elevation: 89 m (292 ft)
- Highest elevation: 142 m (466 ft)
- Lowest elevation: 77 m (253 ft)
- Population (2023): 225
  - Density: 7.14/km^{2} (18.5/sq mi)
- Time zone: UTC+01:00 (CET)
  - Summer (DST): UTC+02:00 (CEST)
- INSEE/Postal code: 02553 /02150
- ^{1} French Land Register data, which excludes lakes, ponds, glaciers > 1 km^{2} (0.386 sq mi or 247 acres) and river estuaries.

Nizy-le-Comte (French pronunciation: [nizi lə kɔ̃t]) is a commune in the Aisne department in Hauts-de-France in northern France. It covers an area of 31.5 km^{2} (12.2 sq mi). The commune, with its population of about 225 residents, is part of the arrondissement of Laon.

== History ==
Nizy-le-Comte was impacted during World War I, experiencing extensive damage. The village has since been rebuilt and now features an 18th-century church and a museum dedicated to the First World War.

== Population ==
Historical population
Year	Pop.	±% p.a.
1968	363	—
1975	293	−3.01%
1982	277	−0.80%
1990	268	−0.41%
1999	250	−0.77%
2007	258	+0.39%
2012	256	−0.16%
2017	244	−0.96%
2023	225	−1.34%
Source: INSEE

== Climate ==
Climate data for Nizy-le-Comte (1991–2020 averages)
Month	Jan	Feb	Mar	Apr	May	Jun	Jul	Aug	Sep	Oct	Nov	Dec	Year
Record high °C (°F)	15.8 (60.4)	20.7 (69.3)	25.0 (77.0)	28.2 (82.8)	31.3 (88.3)	35.3 (95.5)	41.2 (106.2)	39.3 (102.7)	34.2 (93.6)	27.8 (82.0)	20.5 (68.9)	17.0 (62.6)	41.2 (106.2)
Mean daily maximum °C (°F)	6.2 (43.2)	7.4 (45.3)	11.7 (53.1)	15.5 (59.9)	19.2 (66.6)	22.4 (72.3)	25.1 (77.2)	24.8 (76.6)	20.7 (69.3)	15.6 (60.1)	9.8 (49.6)	6.5 (43.7)	15.4 (59.7)
Mean daily minimum °C (°F)	0.6 (33.1)	0.5 (32.9)	2.4 (36.3)	4.3 (39.7)	7.9 (46.2)	10.8 (51.4)	12.7 (54.9)	12.5 (54.5)	9.6 (49.3)	7.0 (44.6)	3.6 (38.5)	1.4 (34.5)	6.1 (43.0)
Record low °C (°F)	−15.5 (4.1)	−18.7 (−1.7)	−11.3 (11.7)	−6.8 (19.8)	−1.7 (28.9)	1.2 (34.2)	3.3 (37.9)	3.5 (38.3)	−0.7 (30.7)	−5.9 (21.4)	−11.9 (10.6)	−15.1 (4.8)	−18.7 (−1.7)
Average precipitation mm (inches)	60.4 (2.38)	52.3 (2.06)	53.0 (2.09)	46.9 (1.85)	60.7 (2.39)	54.4 (2.14)	64.0 (2.52)	67.7 (2.67)	50.8 (2.00)	62.6 (2.46)	61.5 (2.42)	76.4 (3.01)	710.7 (27.98)
Average precipitation days	11.7	10.3	10.3	9.4	10.1	9.1	9.1	9.1	8.6	10.2	11.6	12.9	122.4
Source: Météo France

== See also ==
- Communes of the Aisne department
