= Le Chesne, Ardennes =

Le Chesne
- Part of Bairon et ses environs
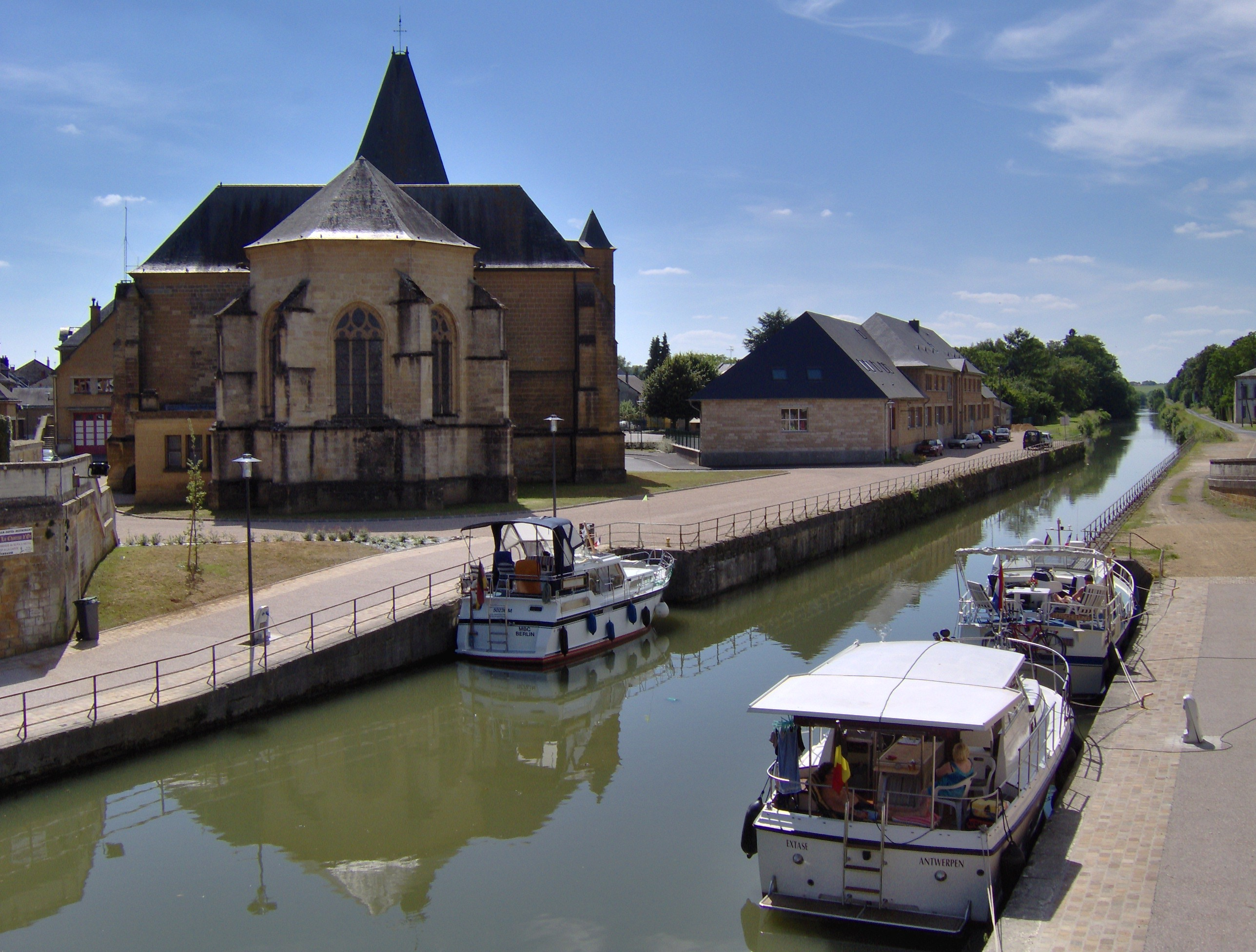

- Coat of arms
- Location of Le Chesne
- Location within France Location within Grand Est
- Coordinates: 49°30′52″N 4°45′54″E
- Country: France
- Region: Grand Est
- Department: Ardennes
- Arrondissement: Vouziers
- Canton: Vouziers
- Commune: Bairon et ses environs
- Area^{1}: 23.87 km^{2} (9.22 sq mi)
- Highest elevation: 227 m (745 ft)
- Lowest elevation: 143 m (469 ft)
- Population (2023): 904
  - Density: 37.9/km^{2} (98.1/sq mi)
- Time zone: UTC+01:00 (CET)
  - Summer (DST): UTC+02:00 (CEST)
- Postal code: 08390
- ^{1} French Land Register data, which excludes lakes, ponds, glaciers > 1 km^{2} (0.386 sq mi or 247 acres) and river estuaries.

Le Chesne (French pronunciation: [lə ʃɛːn]) is a former commune in the Ardennes department in northern France. On 1 January 2016, it was merged into the new commune Bairon et ses environs.

== Population ==
Historical population
Year	Pop.	±% p.a.
1962	1,078	—
1968	1,132	+0.82%
1975	1,047	−1.11%
1982	1,041	−0.08%
1990	974	−0.83%
1999	939	−0.41%
2023	904	−0.16%
Source: EHESS and INSEE

== See also ==
- Communes of the Ardennes department
