= William Sutherland Macdonald =

William Sutherland Macdonald MC JP (30 May 1897 – 21 December 1990) was a British soldier, doctor and the first Principal Medical Officer at the Department of Health at the advent of the National Health Service.

== Life ==
WS Macdonald was born in Invergordon, Scotland in 1897. Educated at George Watson's College, and the University of Edinburgh, he graduated with an MB ChB in 1921. However, his studies were interrupted by the First World War, and he voluntarily enlisted in the Argyll and Sutherland Highlanders and later commissioned into The Border Regiment. He was awarded the Military Cross in 1917 for gallantry in Ypres, Belgium.

After the War, Macdonald trained in General Practice, and was a GP in Leeds for over 30 years, having a practice in the relatively deprived areas of Hunslet and Beeston. He made many friends and was popular here, due to his occasional gifts to impoverished patients. He was Chairman of the Leeds Division of the British Medical Association from 1938 to 1941, and held various senior positions within the organisation throughout his life, as well as being a Magistrate and a senior lecturer at the University of Leeds. With the advent of the National Health Service in 1945, he became senior Principal Medical Officer at the Ministry of Health.
