= Iccia gens =

The gens Iccia was a minor plebeian family at Rome. It is known primarily from a small number of individuals who lived during the first century BC, as well as a number of inscriptions from Gallia Narbonensis.

== Members ==
- Iccius, a native of Durocortorum, a town of Gallia Belgica, who led a deputation from the town to seek an alliance with Caesar in 57 BC. On his return, he defended Bibrax from hostile Belgae. This Iccius was probably not of Roman ancestry, but he may have obtained a Roman name, perhaps from one of the Iccii in Caesar's army; or the resemblance may be accidental.
- Marcus Iccius, appointed praetor of Sicily by Marcus Antonius in November of 44 BC, shortly before Antonius' departure for Cisalpine Gaul.
- Iccius, a friend of Quintus Horatius Flaccus, who tried to dissuade him from seeking adventure and material wealth. In 25 BC, Horace addressed an ode to Iccius, who was preparing to accompany Gaius Aelius Gallus on his expedition to Arabia Felix. About ten years later, Horace composed an epistle to Iccius, who was then legate to Marcus Vipsanius Agrippa in Sicily.
- Gaius Iccius Vaticanus, a lamp-maker at Rome.
- Marcus Iccius, the maker of a small vessel found at Gratianopolis.
- Marcus Iccius, the maker of a small vessel found at Nemausus.
- Marcus Iccius Mummius, commemorated on a tall cippus from Vocontiorum.
- Marcus Iccius Soterichus, named on a cippus at Nemausus.
- Publius Iccius Veratianus, found on an inscription in chapel ruins from Vasio.
- Iccius Vitalis, mentioned in an inscription found in a garden at Nemausus.
- Iccia M. f., commemorated on a huge stone at Noviomagus Tricastinorum.

== See also ==
- List of Roman gentes

== Bibliography ==
- Gaius Julius Caesar, Commentarii de Bello Gallico.
- Marcus Tullius Cicero, Philippicae.
- Quintus Horatius Flaccus (Horace), Carmen Saeculare, Epistulae.
- Dictionary of Greek and Roman Biography and Mythology, William Smith, ed., Little, Brown and Company, Boston (1849).
- Samuel Birch, History of Ancient Pottery: Egyptian, Assyrian, Greek, Etruscan, and Roman, John Murray, London (1873).
- Corpus Inscriptionum Latinarum.
