= John Crawford Buchan =

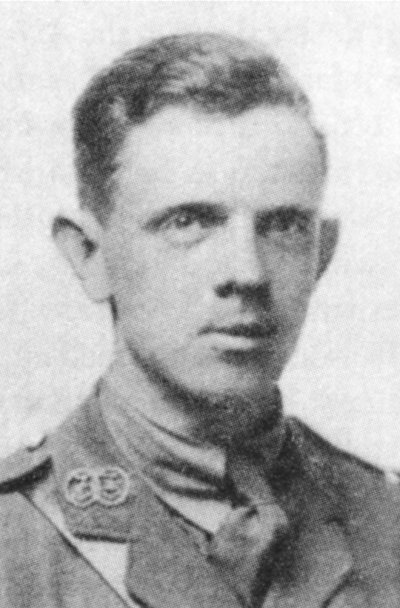
- Lt. John Crawford Buchan
- Born: 10 October 1892; Alloa, Clackmannanshire
- Died: 22 March 1918 (aged 25); Somme, France
- Burial place: Roisel Communal Cemetery Extension, Roisel, France
- Military career
- Allegiance: United Kingdom
- Branch: British Army
- Service years: –1918
- Rank: Second Lieutenant
- Units: Royal Army Medical Corps; Argyll and Sutherland Highlanders
- Conflicts: World War I: Western Front; Second Battle of the Somme (DOW)
- Awards: Victoria Cross

John Crawford Buchan (10 October 1892 – 22 March 1918) was a Scottish recipient of the Victoria Cross, the highest and most prestigious award for gallantry in the face of the enemy that can be awarded to British and Commonwealth forces.

Born on 10 October 1892 in Alloa, Clackmannanshire, Scotland, he was the son of the local newspaper editor. He worked as a reporter before enlisting in the Royal Army Medical Corps in the ranks when World War I broke out. He was later commissioned as a Territorial Force officer into the Argyll and Sutherland Highlanders on 25 January 1917.

== World War I ==
Buchan was 25 years old, and a second lieutenant in the 7th Battalion, Argyll and Sutherland Highlanders (Princess Louise's), British Army, attached to 8th Battalion during the First World War, and was awarded the VC for an act he performed on 21 March 1918 east of Marteville, France. He died the following day, 22 March 1918.

=== Citation ===
For most conspicuous bravery and devotion to duty. When fighting with his platoon in the forward position of the battle zone, 2nd Lt. Buchan, although wounded early in the day, insisted on remaining with his men, and continually visited all his posts, encouraging and cheering his men in spite of most severe shell fire, from which his platoon was suffering heavy casualties.

Later, when the enemy were creeping closer, and heavy machine-gun fire was raking his position, 2nd Lt. Buchan, with utter disregard of his personal safety, continued to visit his posts, and though still further injured accidentally, he continued to encourage his men and visit his posts. Eventually, when he saw the enemy had practically surrounded his command, he collected his platoon and prepared to fight his way back to the supporting line. At this point the enemy, who had crept round his right flank, rushed towards him, shouting out "Surrender." " To hell with surrender," he replied, and shooting the foremost of the enemy, he finally repelled this advance with his platoon. He then fought his way back to the supporting line of the forward position, where he held out till dusk.

At dusk he fell back as ordered, but in spite of his injuries again refused to go to the aid post, saying his place was beside his men. Owing to the unexpected withdrawal of troops on the left flank it was impossible to send orders to 2nd Lt. Buchan to withdraw, as he was already cut off, and he was last seen holding out against overwhelming odds.

The gallantry, self-sacrifice, and utter disregard of personal safety displayed by this officer during these two days of most severe fighting is in keeping with the highest traditions of the British Army.

— The London Gazette, 21 May 1918

He was buried at Roisel Communal Cemetery Extension, Roisel, Somme, France (Plot: II. L. 6)

== Medals ==
His medals are in the collection of the Argyll & Sutherland Highlanders Museum, Stirling Castle, Scotland.

== Bibliography ==
- Gliddon, Gerald (2013) [2004]. Spring Offensive 1918. VCs of the First World War. Stroud, Gloucestershire: The History Press. ISBN 978-0-7524-8730-4.
- Ross, Graham (1995). Scotland's Forgotten Valour. MacLean Press. ISBN 978-1899272006.
- Oldfield, Paul (2019). Victoria Crosses on the Western Front: Continuation of the German 1918 Offensives, 24 March–24 July 1918. Pen and Sword Books. ISBN 978-1-4738-2710-3.
