= Saint-Thomas, Aisne =

Saint-Thomas
- Commune
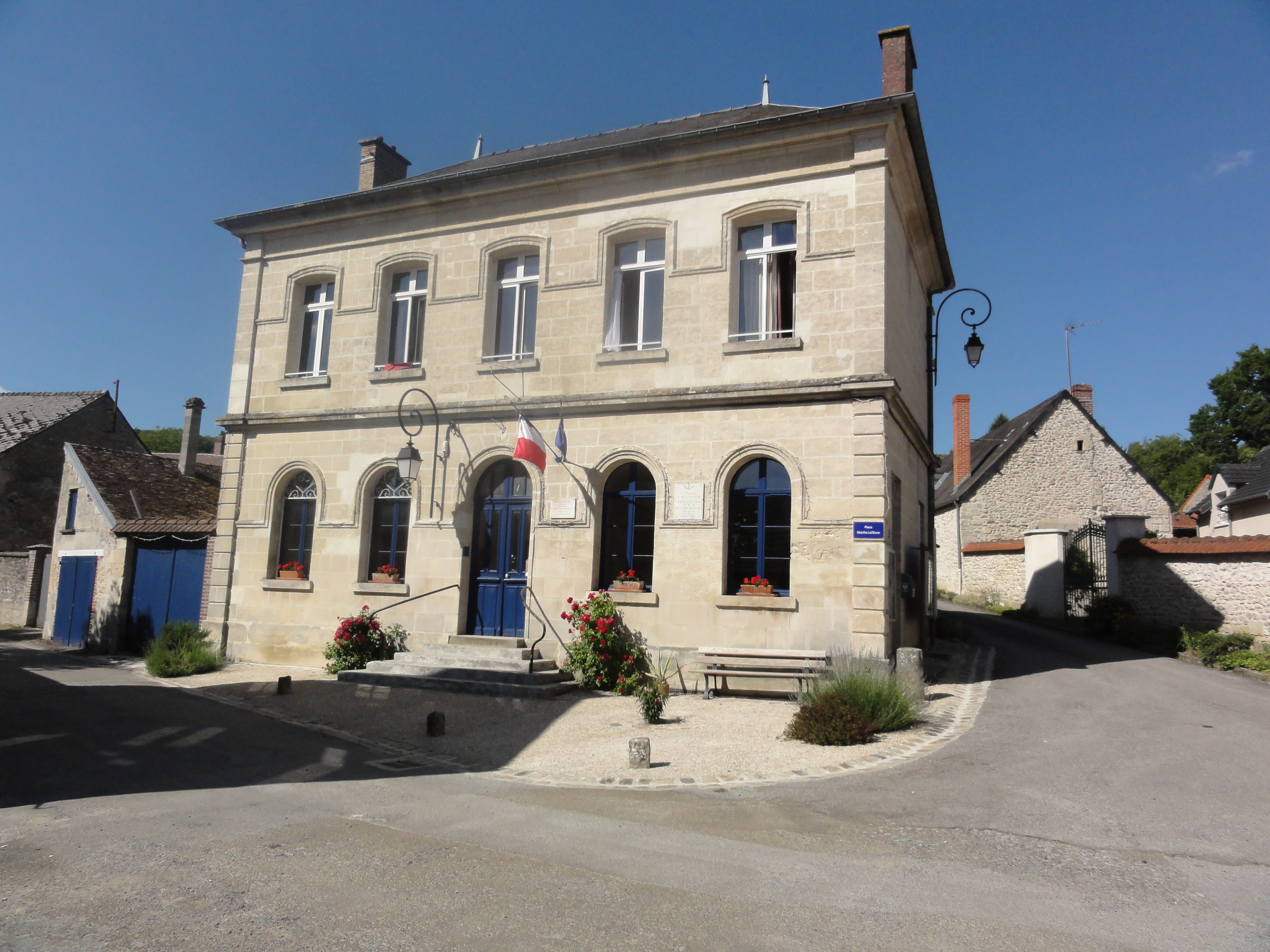
- The town hall of Saint-Thomas
- Location of Saint-Thomas
- Location within France Location within Hauts-de-France
- Coordinates: 49°29′50″N 3°49′15″E
- Country: France
- Region: Hauts-de-France
- Department: Aisne
- Arrondissement: Laon
- Canton: Villeneuve-sur-Aisne
- Intercommunality: Chemin des Dames

Government
  - Mayor (2026–32): Guillaume Christodoulou
- Area^{1}: 2.5 km^{2} (0.97 sq mi)
- Elevation: 104 m (341 ft)
- Highest elevation: 207 m (679 ft)
- Lowest elevation: 88 m (289 ft)
- Population (2023): 71
  - Density: 28/km^{2} (74/sq mi)
- Time zone: UTC+01:00 (CET)
  - Summer (DST): UTC+02:00 (CEST)
- INSEE/Postal code: 02696 /02820
- ^{1} French Land Register data, which excludes lakes, ponds, glaciers > 1 km^{2} (0.386 sq mi or 247 acres) and river estuaries.

Saint-Thomas (French pronunciation: [sɛ̃ tɔmɑ]) is a commune in the Aisne department in Hauts-de-France in northern France.

== Population ==
Historical population
Year	Pop.	±% p.a.
1968	98	—
1975	81	−2.68%
1982	91	+1.68%
1990	80	−1.60%
1999	66	−2.11%
2007	74	+1.44%
2012	106	+7.45%
2017	80	−5.47%
2023	71	−1.97%
Source: INSEE

== See also ==
- Communes of the Aisne department
