= Voncq =

- Commune
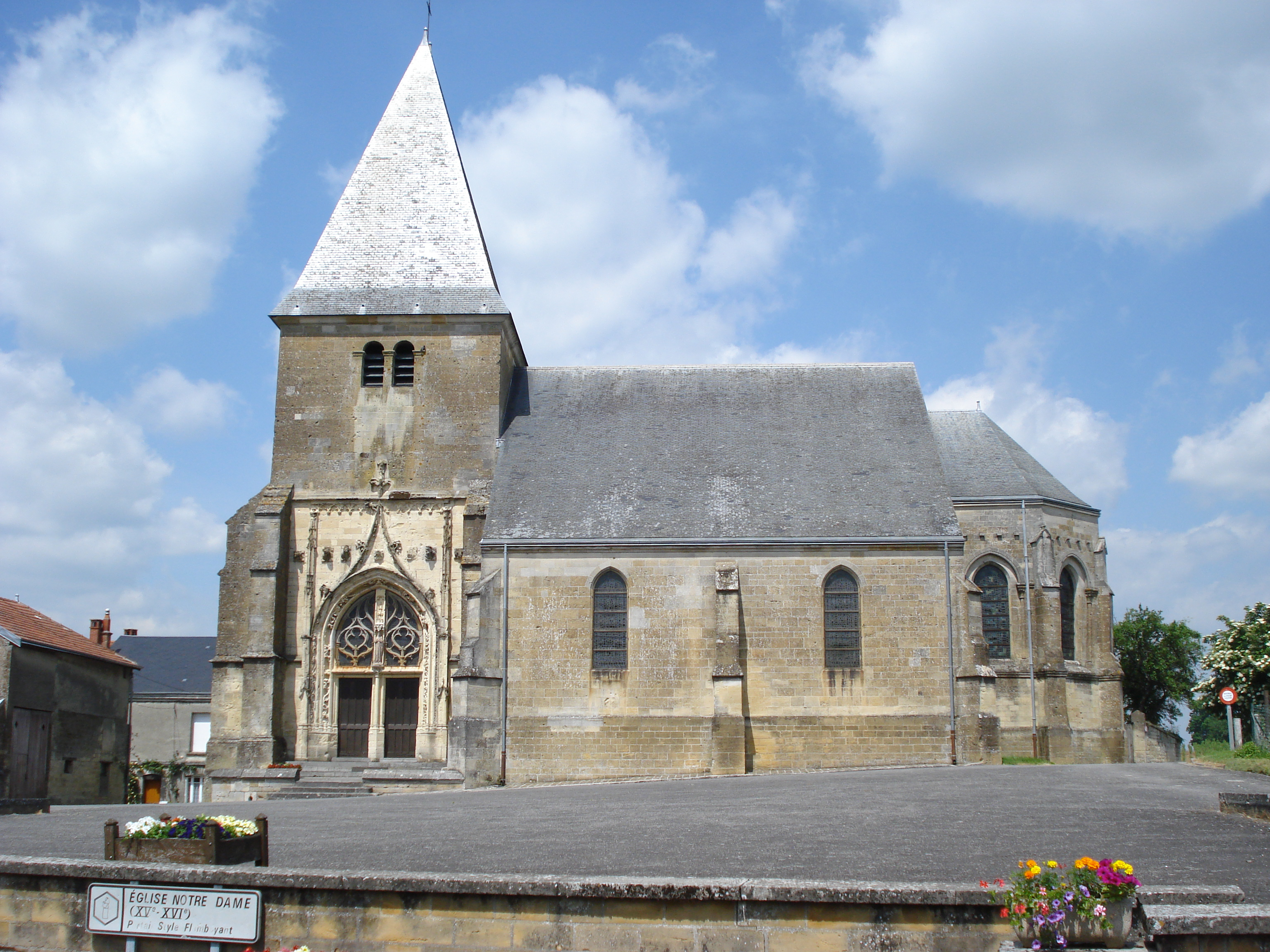
- The church in Voncq

- Coat of arms
- Location of Voncq
- Location within France Location within Grand Est
- Coordinates: 49°28′17″N 4°39′56″E
- Country: France
- Region: Grand Est
- Department: Ardennes
- Arrondissement: Vouziers
- Canton: Attigny
- Intercommunality: Crêtes Préardennaises

Government
  - Mayor (2020–2026): Marie-France Kubiak
- Area^{1}: 19.87 km^{2} (7.67 sq mi)
- Elevation: 160 m (520 ft)
- Highest elevation: 194 m (636 ft)
- Lowest elevation: 82 m (269 ft)
- Population (2023): 210
  - Density: 11/km^{2} (27/sq mi)
- Time zone: UTC+01:00 (CET)
  - Summer (DST): UTC+02:00 (CEST)
- INSEE/Postal code: 08489 /08400
- ^{1} French Land Register data, which excludes lakes, ponds, glaciers > 1 km^{2} (0.386 sq mi or 247 acres) and river estuaries.

Voncq (French pronunciation: [vɔ̃k]) is a commune in the Ardennes department and Grand Est region of north-eastern France.

== Population ==
Historical population
Year	Pop.	±% p.a.
1968	334	—
1975	296	−1.71%
1982	245	−2.67%
1990	223	−1.17%
1999	238	+0.73%
2007	222	−0.87%
2012	223	+0.09%
2017	217	−0.54%
2023	210	−0.55%
Source: INSEE

== See also ==
- Communes of the Ardennes department
