= Dix =

DIX or Dix may refer to:

== Computing ==
- Danish Internet Exchange Point, in Copenhagen
- Data Integrity Extensions, data corruption error-handling field in data storage technology
- Device Independent X, part of the 2D graphics device driver in the X.Org Server
- DIX Ethernet, an Ethernet frame type

== People ==
=== Surname ===
- Adrian Dix (born 1964), Canadian politician
- Alan Dix, British author and university professor
- Arnold Dix, Australian barrister and scientist
- Bernard Dix (1925–1995), British trade unionist
- Beulah Marie Dix (1876–1970), American screenwriter, playwright and novelist
- Carl Dix (born 1948), American communist
- De'Audra Dix (born 1984), American football player
- Dorothea Dix (1802–1887), American social worker
- Dorothy Dix (1861–1951), American journalist
- Drew Dennis Dix (born 1944), US Army officer awarded the Medal of Honor
- Eddie Dix (born 1970), Dutch baseball player
- Edwin Asa Dix (1860–1911), AKA Edwin Augustus Dix, American author
- Emily Dix (1904–1972), Welsh palaeobotanist
- Eulabee Dix (1878–1961), American artist
- Frederick Dix (1883–966), British speed skater
- Gioele Dix (born 1956), Italian actor and comedian
- Gregory Dix (1902–1952), English priest and liturgical scholar
- Helena Dix (born 1979), Australian operatic soprano
- Jan Dix, German musician
- J. D. Dix (born 2005), American baseball player
- Joan Dix (1918–1991), English figure skater
- John Alden Dix (1860–1928), New York governor
- John Adams Dix (1798–1879), American Secretary of the Treasury, Governor of New York and Union major general during the Civil War
- John Ross Dix (1811-after 1863), British writer and poet in Great Britain and America
- Margaret Dix (1902–1991), British neuro-otologist
- Margaret A. Dix (1939–2025), British-born Guatemalan botanist
- Michèle Dix, British civil engineer
- Morgan Dix (1827–1908), American Episcopal priest and theologian
- Otto Dix (1891–1969), German expressionist
- Peter Dix (1953–1988), Irish sailor
- Richard Dix (1893–1949), American actor
- Richard Dix (footballer) (1924–1990), English footballer
- Robert Dix (1935–2018), American actor
- Ronnie Dix (1912–1998), English footballer
- Roscoe D. Dix (1839–1912), American politician and Michigan Auditor General
- Rose Ellen Dix, English YouTuber
- Shane Dix (born 1960), Australian writer
- Sophie Dix (born 1969), English actress
- Stephen Dix Jr. (born 2002), American football player
- Ute Dix (born 1955), German speed skater
- Walter Dix (born 1986), American track and field athlete
- William Dix (disambiguation), various people

=== Given name ===
- Dix Terne, 1950s West German bobsledder

== Places ==
=== Switzerland ===
- Lac des Dix, the reservoir created by Grande Dixence Dam

=== United States ===
- Dix, Illinois
- Dix Township, Ford County, Illinois, USA
- Dix, Nebraska
- Dix, New York
- Dix Hill, in Raleigh, North Carolina
- Dix Mountain, in the Adirondacks, New York
- Dix Range, in the Adirondacks, New York
- Dix River, in Kentucky
  - Dix Dam
- Dix Stadium, in Kent, Ohio
- Fort Dix, an Army post in New Jersey

== Other uses ==
- 509 AD (year DIX)
- D-IX, a drug cocktail developed in Germany during WW2 to relieve fatigue
- Dix (steamboat), a steamboat which ran on Puget Sound, USA from 1904 to 1906
- The Dix, a fictional R&B group
- Dix, a hymn tune used with hymn For the Beauty of the Earth and As with Gladness, Men of Old; named for William C. Dix
- DIX, the number 509 in Roman numerals

== See also ==
- Dicks (disambiguation)
- D9 (disambiguation), including a list of topics named D.IX, etc.
- 509 (disambiguation) (Roman numeral DIX)
- Dixville (disambiguation)
- Dixboro, Michigan, USA
- Dixton, Wales
- Dick (disambiguation)
