= George McIntosh =

Recipient of the Victoria Cross

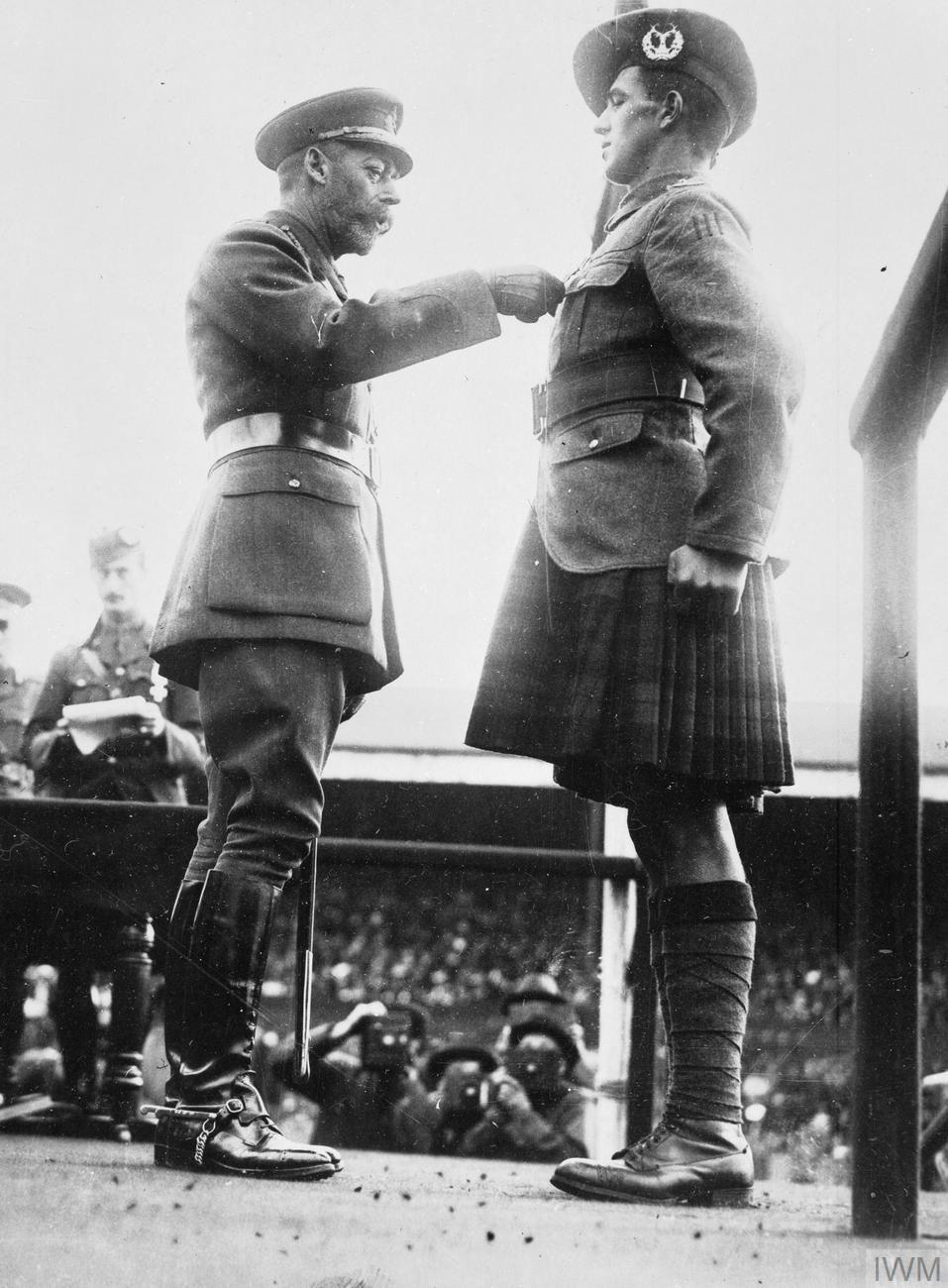
- Private McIntosh is presented with the Victoria Cross by King George V
- Born: 24 April 1897; Buckie, Banffshire
- Died: 20 June 1968 (71 years old); Aberdeen, Scotland
- Burial place: New Cemetery, Buckie
- Military career
- Allegiance: United Kingdom
- Branch: British Army; Royal Air Force
- Rank: Flight Sergeant WWII; Private WWI
- Units: The Gordon Highlanders; No. 1 Squadron RAF
- Conflicts: World War I World War II
- Awards: Victoria Cross

George Imlach McIntosh VC (24 April 1897 – 20 June 1968) was a Scottish recipient of the Victoria Cross, the highest and most prestigious award for gallantry in the face of the enemy that can be awarded to British and Commonwealth forces.

== Details ==
He was 20 years old, and a private in the 1/6th Battalion, The Gordon Highlanders, British Army during the First World War when the following deed took place at the Battle of Passchendaele for which he was awarded the VC.

On 31 July 1917 at Ypres, Belgium, during the consolidation of a position, the company came under machine-gun fire at close range and Private Mclntosh immediately rushed forward under heavy fire and reaching the emplacement, threw a Mills grenade into it, killing two of the enemy and wounding a third. Subsequently, entering the dug-out he found two light machine-guns which he carried back with him. His quick grasp of the situation and the rapidity with which he acted undoubtedly saved many of his comrades and enabled the consolidation to proceed unhindered by machine-gun fire.

George McIntosh was born in Buckie, Banffshire. McIntosh went on to join the Royal Air Force and served in World War II, and during 1942 was the senior NCO with No 1 squadron. He later achieved the rank of Flight Sergeant.

His Victoria Cross is displayed at the Gordon Highlanders Museum, Aberdeen, Scotland.

== Freemasonry ==
McIntosh was a Scottish Freemason being Initiated in Lodge Gordon, No. 589, (Buckie, Banffshire, Scotland) on 7 April 1920, Passed on 10 March and Raised on 6 April 1921.
