= John Frederick MacKay =

Recipient of the Victoria Cross (1873–1930)

John Frederick MacKay VC
- Born: 6 June 1873; Edinburgh, Scotland
- Died: 9 January 1930 (aged 56); Nice, France
- Burial place: Cimitiere De Caucade, Nice
- Military career
- Allegiance: United Kingdom
- Branch: British Army
- Rank: Lieutenant-Colonel
- Units: Gordon Highlanders; West African Frontier Force; Hampshire Regiment; Argyll and Sutherland Highlanders
- Conflicts: Tirah Campaign; Second Boer War; World War I
- Awards: Victoria Cross

Lieutenant-Colonel John Frederick MacKay VC (6 June 1873 – 9 January 1930) was a Scottish recipient of the Victoria Cross, the highest and most prestigious award for gallantry in the face of the enemy that can be awarded to British and Commonwealth forces.

== Details ==
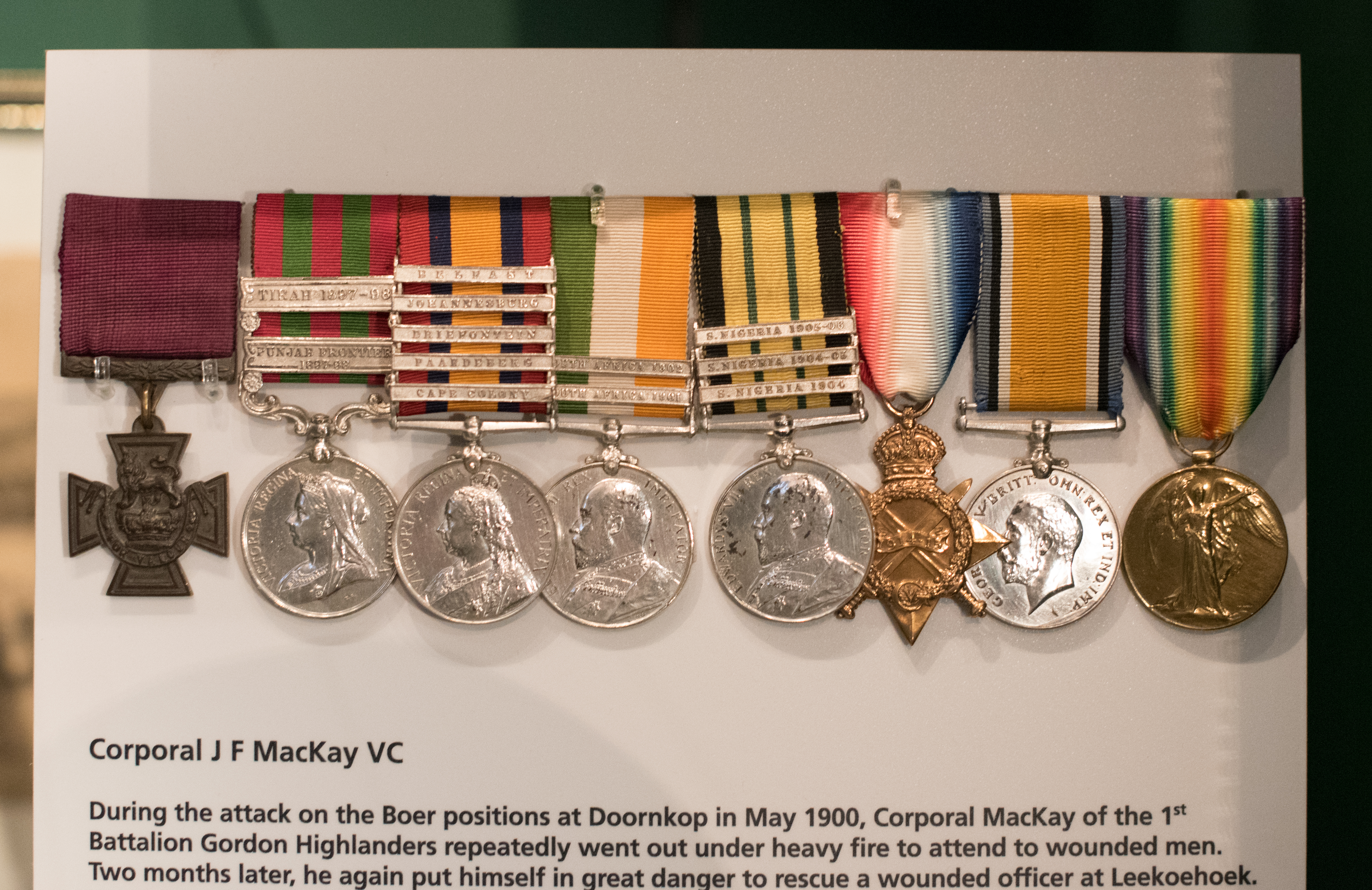
Mackay's medals on display at the Gordon Highlanders Museum.

He was 26 years old, and a lance-corporal in the 1st Battalion, The Gordon Highlanders, British Army during the Second Boer War when the following deed took place at Crow's Nest Hill, Johannesburg, for which he was awarded the VC.

On the 29th May, 1900, during the action on Crow's Nest Hill, near Johannesburg, Corporal McKay repeatedly rushed forward, under a withering fire at short ranges, to attend to wounded comrades, dressing their wounds whilst he himself was without shelter, and in one instance carrying a wounded man from the open, under a heavy fire, to the shelter of a boulder.

His Victoria Cross is displayed at the Gordon Highlanders Museum, Aberdeen, Scotland along with his other medals.

Ribbon	Description	Notes
	Victoria Cross (VC)	1900
	India Medal	Clasps: Tirah 1897-98 and Punjab Frontier 1897–98.
	Queen's South Africa Medal	Clasps: Belfast, Johannesburg, Driefontein, Paardeburg, Cape Colony
	King's South Africa Medal	Clasps: South Africa 1901 and South Africa 1902
	Africa General Service Medal	Clasps: S. Nigeria 1905–06, S. Nigeria 1904-05 and S. Nigeria 1904
	1914–15 Star	
	British War Medal	
	Victory Medal	

== Further service ==
Mackay was commissioned into the King's Own Scottish Borderers as a second lieutenant on 27 July 1901, while still in South Africa. Following the end of the Second Boer War in June 1902, he left Durban for England on the SS Nubia in August 1902. One year later, he was promoted to acting lieutenant while serving with the West African Frontier Force (WAFF). This rank was confirmed in 1905. He transferred to the Hampshire Regiment as a captain in 1907 and then to the Argyll and Sutherland Highlanders in 1908, still attached to the WAFF. He served with the Argylls for the rest of his career, although attached to other regiments. From November 1908 to 1912 he served as adjutant of the 7th (Volunteer) Battalion, Royal Scots. In November 1914 he became adjutant of the Indian Volunteers, but later moved to the 21st Battalion, Northumberland Fusiliers (2nd Tyneside Scottish). In 1915 he was promoted major. In August 1916 he was promoted lieutenant-colonel commanding a battalion of the Highland Light Infantry. He retired in 1921.
