= William Dick =

William Dick may refer to:

- Billy Dick (1889–1960), Australian rules footballer
- William Dick of Braid (1580–1655), Scottish financier
- William Dick (Australian politician) (1865–1932)
- William Dick (cricketer) (1922–2004), Australian cricketer
- William Dick (footballer) (born 1901), Scottish footballer (Airdrieonians, Hibernian, Bradford Park Avenue)
- William Dick (Manitoba politician) (1821–1904), politician in Manitoba, Canada
- William Dick (Wisconsin politician), member of the Wisconsin State Assembly
- William Dick (British Columbia politician), member of the Legislative Assembly of British Columbia
- William Reid Dick (1879–1961), Scottish sculptor
- William Wentworth FitzWilliam Dick (1805–1892), member of the UK Parliament for Wicklow
- Willie Dick (footballer) (born 1966), Australian rules footballer
- William Dick (veterinary surgeon) (1793–1866), founder of the Royal (Dick) School of Veterinary Studies in Edinburgh, Scotland

== See also ==
- William Dick-Cunyngham (1851–1900), Scottish recipient of the Victoria Cross
- William Dix (disambiguation)
