= 9D =

9D or 9-D can refer to:

- IATA code for Toumaï Air Tchad
- New York State Route 9D
- Kepler-9d, an extrasolar planet orbiting the star Kepler-9
- SSH 9D, alternate designation for Washington State Route 108
- Navy AIM-9D/G/H, designation for the AIM-9 Sidewinder
- Orion 9D, a model of Lockheed Model 9 Orion aircraft
- Yak-9D, a model of Soviet Yakovlev Yak-9
- GCR Class 9D, a class of British 0-6-0 steam locomotive

== See also ==
- D9 (disambiguation)
