= 509 (disambiguation) =

509 may refer to:

- 509 (number)
- 509, the year
- 509 Harbourfront, a streetcar route in Toronto
- 509th Operations Group, the 509th Operations Group of the USAAF
- 509 error, an unofficial HTTP response code meaning bandwidth exceeded
- Area code 509, a telephone area code
- FN 509, a semi-automatic pistol manufactured by FN Herstal
- x.509, a public key infrastructure certificate standard
- Fiat 509, a small family car

== See also ==
- dix (disambiguation) (509 in Roman numerals is "dix" or "DIX")
