= 92nd (Gordon Highlanders) Regiment of Foot =

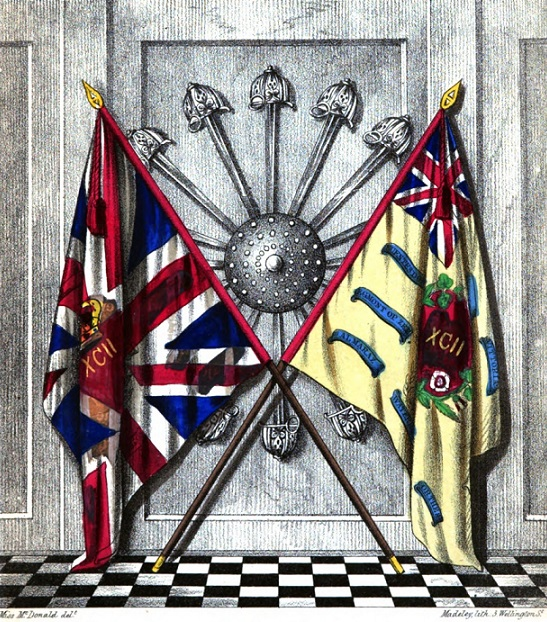
- Colours of the 92nd (Gordon Highlanders) Regiment of Foot
- Active: 1794–1881
- Country: Kingdom of Great Britain (1794–1800); United Kingdom (1801–1881)
- Branch: British Army
- Type: Highland Infantry Regiment
- Size: One battalion (two battalions 1803–1814)
- Garrison/HQ: Castlehill Barracks, Aberdeen
- Nickname: The Gay Gordons
- Engagements: Napoleonic Wars; Crimean War; Indian Rebellion; Battle of Majuba Hill

The 92nd (Gordon Highlanders) Regiment of Foot was a British Army infantry regiment, raised in 1794. Under the Childers Reforms it amalgamated with the 75th (Stirlingshire) Regiment of Foot to form the Gordon Highlanders in 1881.

== History ==
=== Formation ===
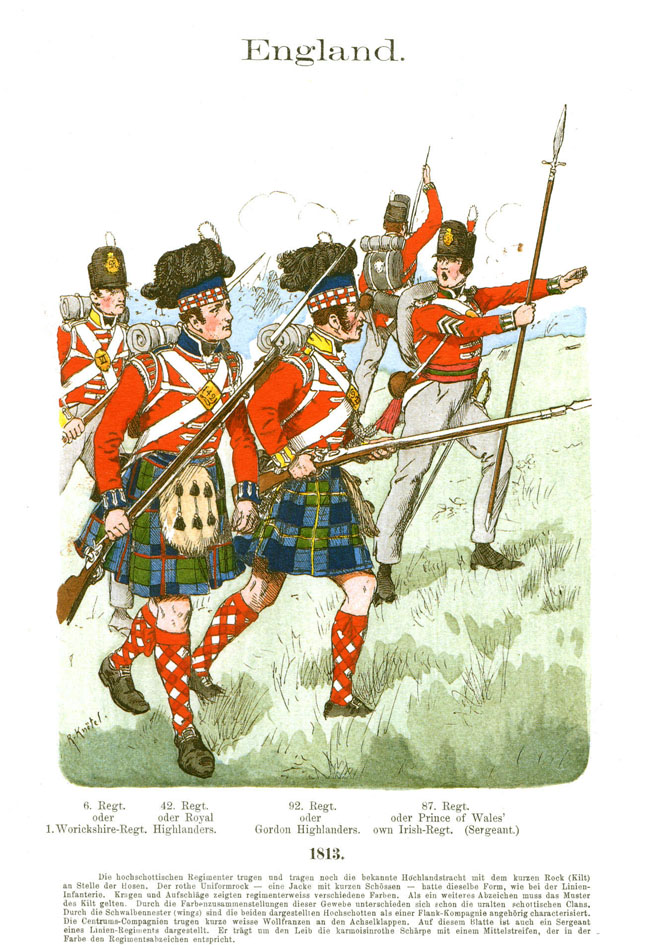
A regimental private (centre) in 1813

The regiment was raised in Aberdeenshire by General George Gordon, 5th Duke of Gordon, as the 100th (Gordon Highlanders) Regiment of Foot, in response to the threat posed by the French Revolution, on 10 February 1794. It embarked for Gibraltar in September 1794 and then moved on to Corsica in June 1795. From Corsica a detachment was sent to Elba in August 1796 and the whole regiment returned to Gibraltar in September 1796. The regiment returned to England in March 1798 but was then deployed to Ireland in May 1798 to help suppress the Irish Rebellion. The regiment was re-ranked as the 92nd (Highland) Regiment of Foot in October 1798.

The regiment embarked for Holland in August 1799 and saw action at the Battle of Alkmaar in October 1799 during the Anglo-Russian invasion of Holland, an intervention which was aimed to overthrow the Batavian Republic, a French client republic. It returned home later that month. The regiment embarked for Menorca in June 1800 and then sailed on to Abu Qir in Egypt in March 1801 to take part in the Egyptian Campaign. It saw action at the Battle of Mandora on 13 March 1801. This was a preliminary action before the Battle of Alexandria eight days later on 21 March. That morning, the regiment had been ordered to return to Abukir, having now only 150 effective men, because of illness and casualties sustained. However, on hearing the sound of firing, the regiment saw the commander-in-chief, Sir Ralph Abercromby, passing on his horse and called out to be allowed to return to the line of battle, to which he gave his assent. The regiment sailed for home in October 1801.

=== Napoleonic Wars ===
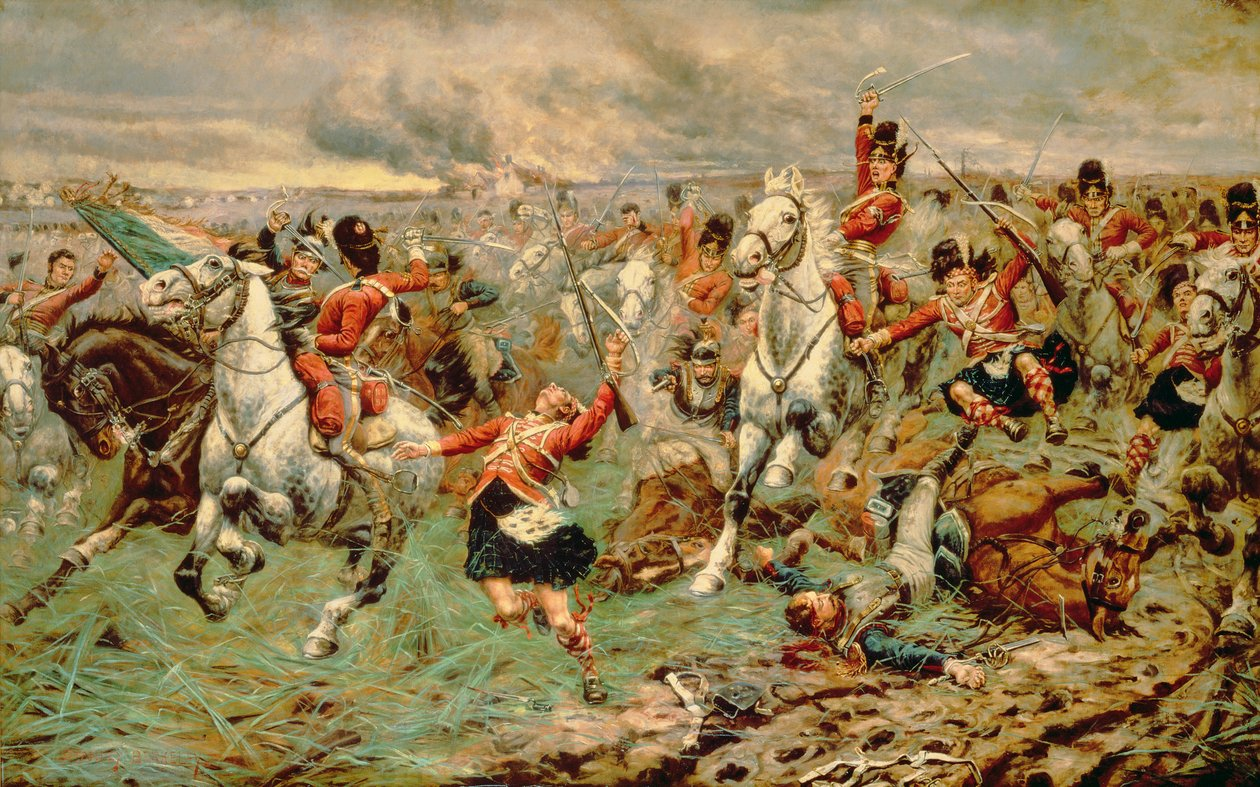
The regiment joining the Scots Greys' charge by hanging on to their stirrups at Waterloo

A second battalion was raised in November 1803 but it solely served as a reinforcement pool and never left the United Kingdom. The 1st Battalion embarked for Copenhagen in August 1807 and took part in the Battle of Køge and then the Battle of Copenhagen later that month during the Gunboat War.

The regiment embarked for Portugal in July 1808 for service in the Peninsular War. It served under Lieutenant-General Sir John Moore at the Battle of Corunna in January 1809 and subsequent evacuation. The regiment was renamed as the 92nd Regiment of Foot in 1809. It then took part in the disastrous Walcheren Campaign in autumn 1809.

The regiment returned to Portugal in September 1810 to resume its service under General Viscount Wellesley in the Peninsular War. It saw action at the Battle of Fuentes de Oñoro in May 1811, the Second Siege of Badajoz in June 1811 and the Battle of Arroyo dos Molinos in October 1811 as well as the Battle of Almaraz in May 1812 and the Battle of Vitoria in June 1813. It then pursued the French Army into France and fought at the Battle of the Pyrenees in July 1813, the Battle of Nivelle in November 1813 and the Battle of the Nive in December 1813 as well as the Battle of Orthez in February 1814 and the Battle of Toulouse in April 1814.

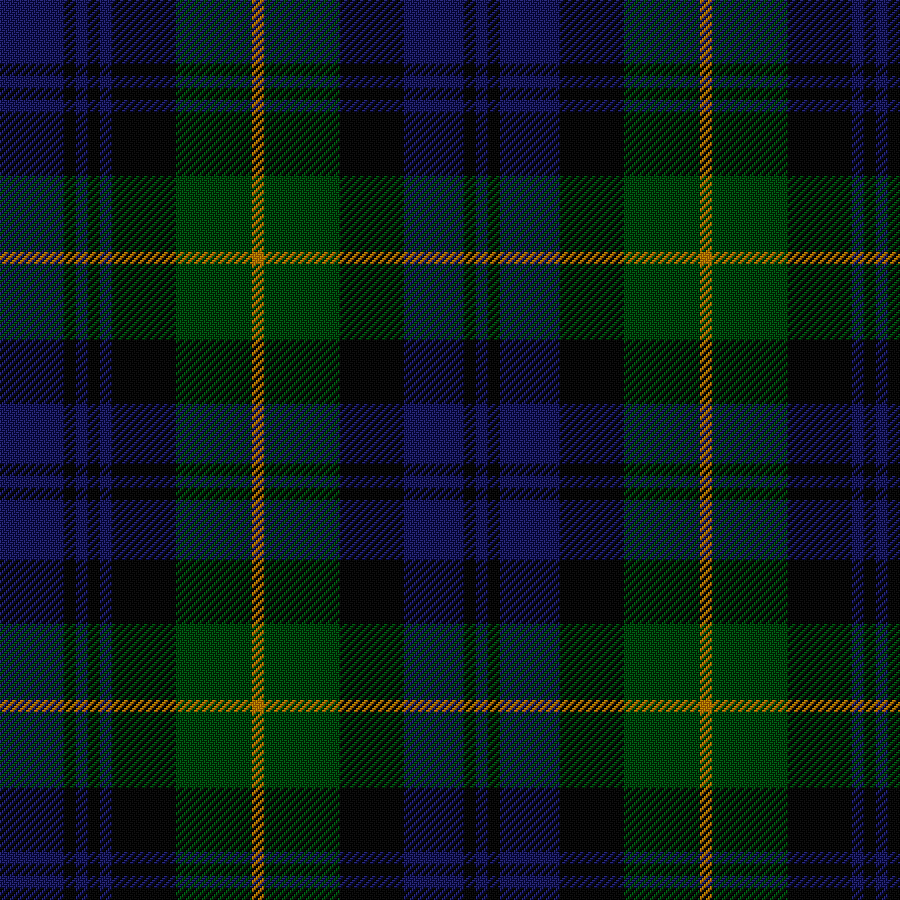
The tartan of the 92nd, based on Black Watch but with a yellow over-check, and a single black overcheck converted to double like the rest of the black over-checks in the design. In modified form, the 92nd tartan became the main Clan Gordon pattern.

The regiment embarked for the continent again in May 1815 for service in the Hundred Days campaign. The regiment had a key role in the Battle of Quatre Bras on 16 June 1815 as one of the regiments defending the disputed crossroads and which later halted a French attack with a bayonet charge. Two days later the regiment was in action again at the Battle of Waterloo. At an early stage, Napoleon's troops attacked the left of the Allied line, and the regiment was ordered to charge the leading French column. The regiment did so and the French column then broke in disorder. The horses of the Scots Greys passed through the regiment to get to the scattering French troops and press the advantage. At this point some members of the regiment clung to the stirrups of the passing Greys so that they could reach the French troops. Corporal Dickson of "F" Troop of the Scots Greys, reported: "They were all Gordons, and as we passed through them they shouted 'Go at them the Greys! Scotland for ever!' My blood thrilled at this and I clutched my sabre tighter. Many of them grasped our stirrups and in the fiercest excitement, dashed with us into the fight." After the battle, the regiment marched to Paris and then embarked for home in December 1815. After arriving in Edinburgh on 7 September 1816, it was cheered by a large crowd.

=== The Victorian era ===
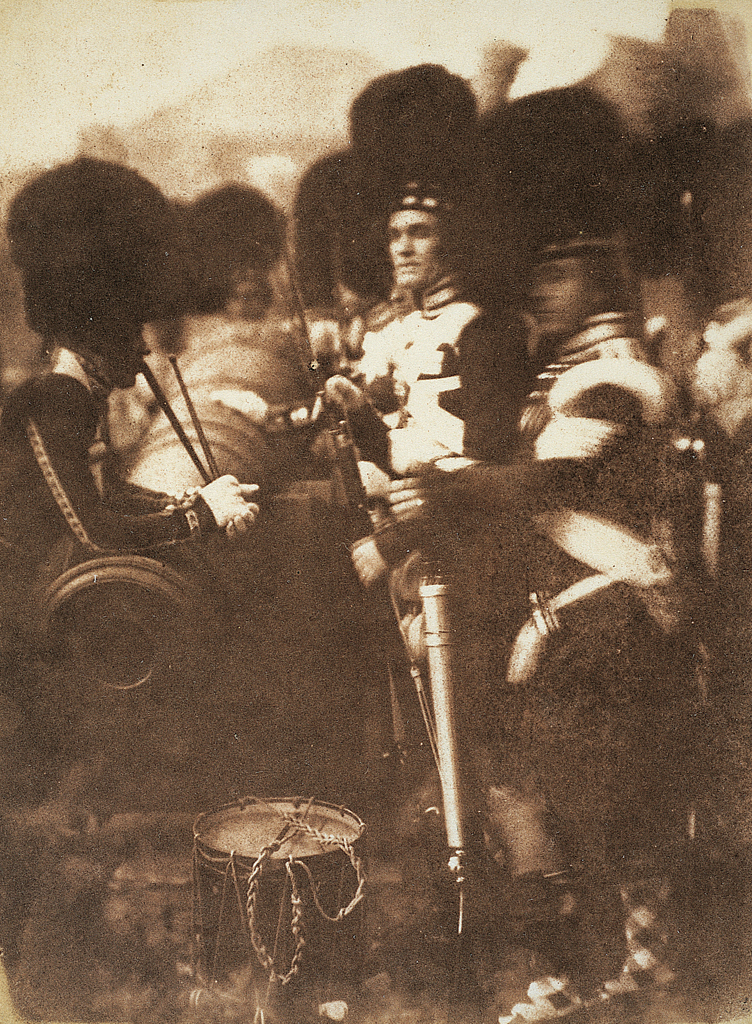
92nd Gordon Highlanders at Edinburgh Castle, 1846

The regiment embarked for Jamaica in April 1819; many of the troops died from yellow fever, before the regiment returned home in 1827. The regiment embarked for Gibraltar in 1834 and went on to Barbados in 1841 before returning home again in 1844. It was deployed to the Ionian Islands in 1851 and to Gibraltar in 1853 from where it was dispatched to take part in the Siege of Sevastopol during the Crimean War but saw no serious action. The regiment embarked for India in January 1858 to help suppress the Indian Rebellion and were engaged in several skirmishes with remaining rebel forces. The regiment recovered its original designation being renamed the 92nd (Gordon Highlanders) Regiment of Foot in July 1861. The regiment embarked for home in January 1863.

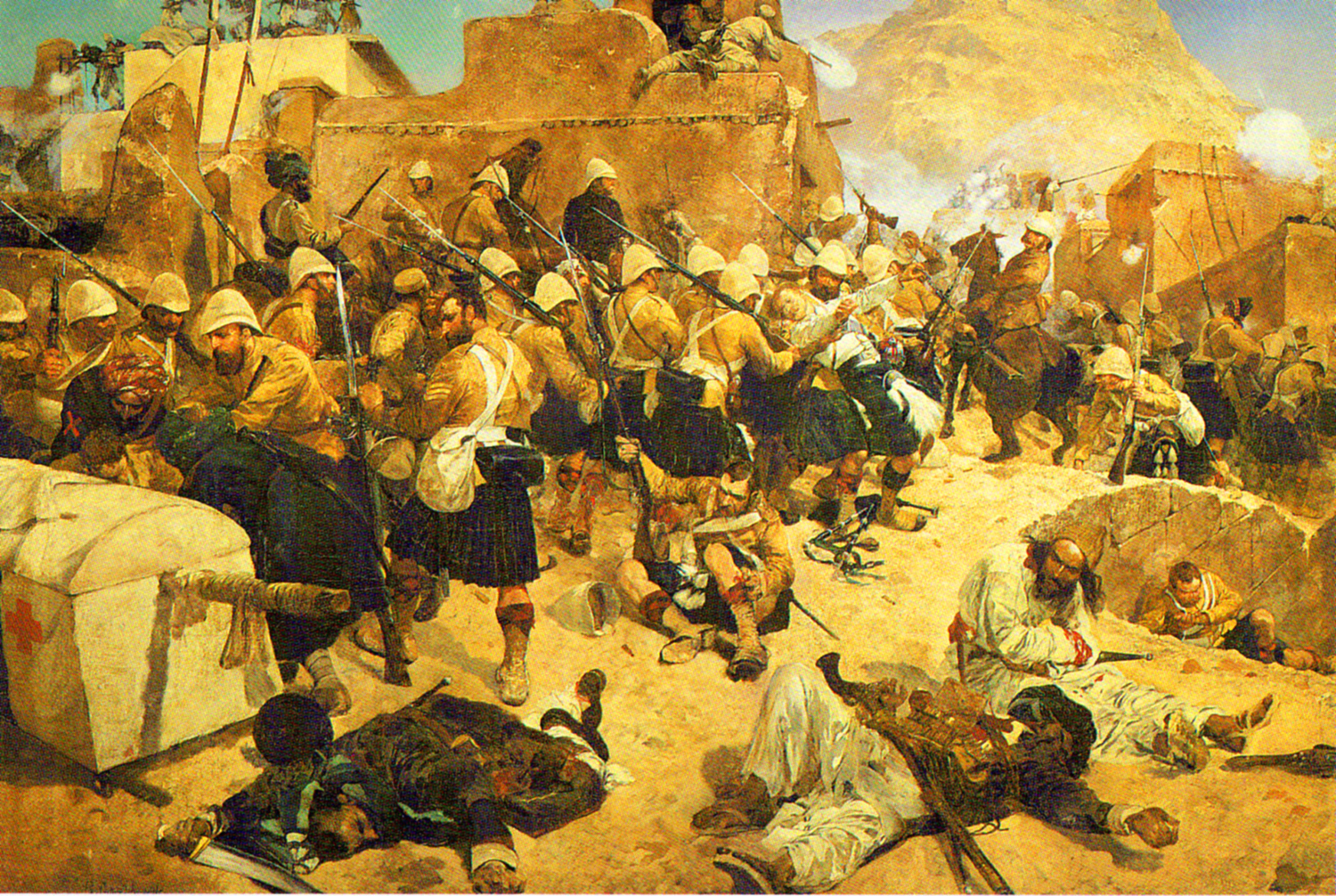
92nd Highlanders at Kandahar in September 1880 by Richard Caton Woodville.

The regiment returned to India in 1868. In December 1878, the regiment was ordered to Afghanistan where it was engaged in various security operations following the outbreak of the Second Anglo-Afghan War. In October 1879, it took part in the Battle of Charasiab, where the regiment captured three hills, thereby turning the enemy's flank. Major George White received the Victoria Cross for his part in this action. A further Victoria Cross was won by Lieutenant William Dick-Cunyngham at the Siege of the Sherpur Cantonment on 13 December 1879. At the end of August 1880, the regiment formed part of the force which marched under General Frederick Roberts from Kabul to Kandahar, and at the Battle of Kandahar on 1 September 1880, formed part of the 1st Brigade, which led the advance in sweeping the enemy out of the closely wooded enclosures along the western slopes of the hill on which the village of Gundi Mullah Sahibdad stood.

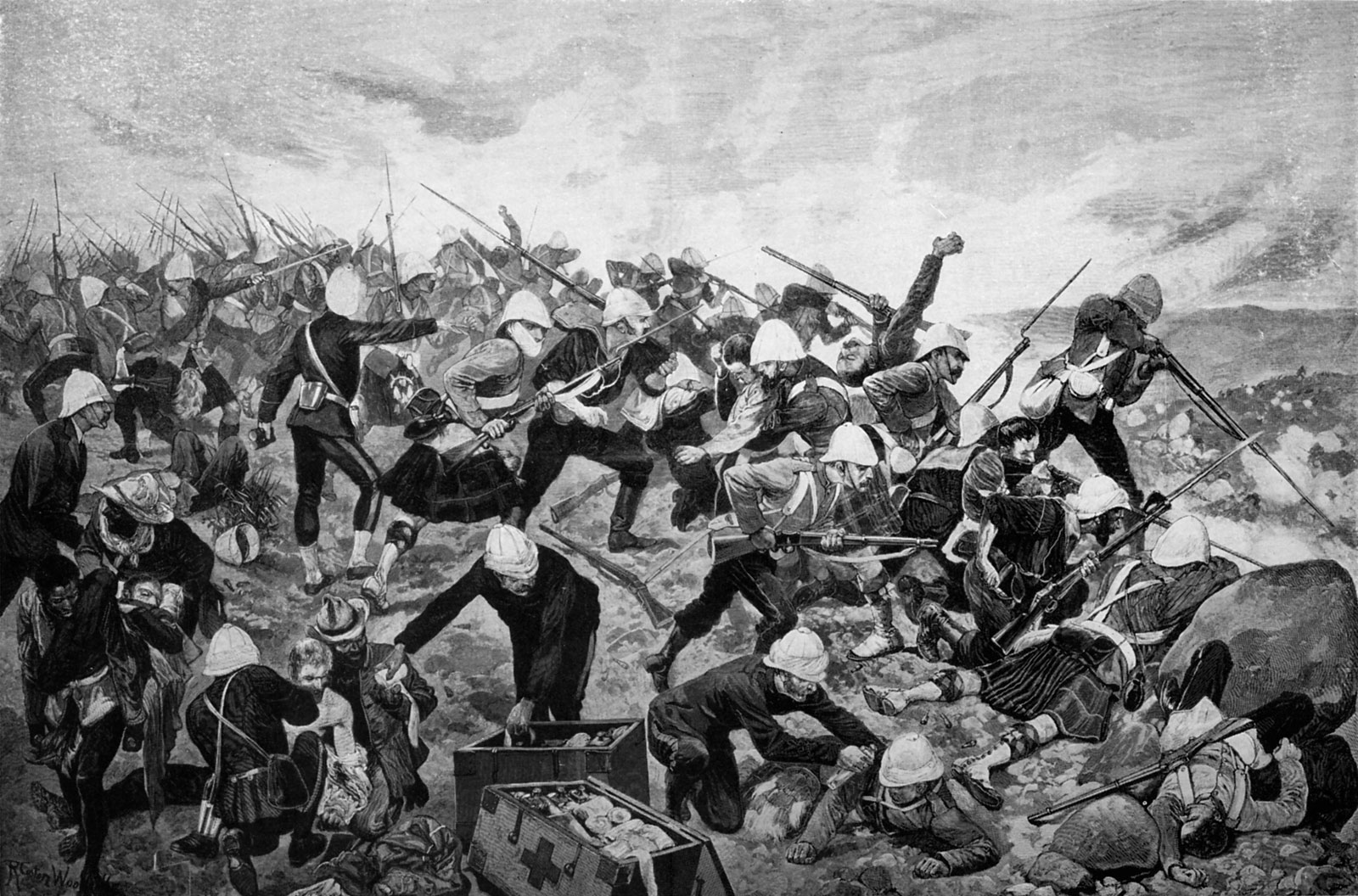
An artist's impression of the last stand at Majuba Hill in February 1881

Instead of returning to the United Kingdom in 1881, the regiment was diverted to Natal to serve in the First Boer War. The regiment participated in the disastrous Battle of Majuba Hill on 27 February 1881. After capturing the hilltop in order to dominate the Boer line, the force of 350 British soldiers of the 58th and 92nd Regiments including a number of Royal Navy gunners, found themselves exposed to heavy and accurate fire early on the following day. This was followed by an assault by 2,000 Boers; despite a desperate last stand, the survivors were swept from the summit.

As part of the Cardwell Reforms of the 1870s, where single-battalion regiments were linked together to share a single depot and recruiting district in the United Kingdom, the 92nd was linked with the 93rd (Sutherland Highlanders) Regiment of Foot, and assigned to district no. 56 at Castlehill Barracks in Aberdeen. On 1 July 1881 the Childers Reforms came into effect and the regiment amalgamated with the 75th (Stirlingshire) Regiment of Foot to form the Gordon Highlanders. The Regimental Colours of the 92nd were laid-up in St Giles' Cathedral, Edinburgh, some two years later by the Duke of Cambridge, where they remain to the present day.

== Battle honours ==
Battle honours won by the regiment were:

- Egmont-Op-Zee
- French Revolutionary Wars: Mandora, Egypt
- Peninsular War: Corunna, Fuentes D'Onor, Almaraz, Vittoria, Pyrenees, Nive, Orthes, Peninsula
- Napoleonic Wars: Waterloo
- Second Anglo-Afghan War: Charasiah, Kabul 1879, Kandahar 1880, Afghanistan 1878–80

== Victoria Cross awards ==
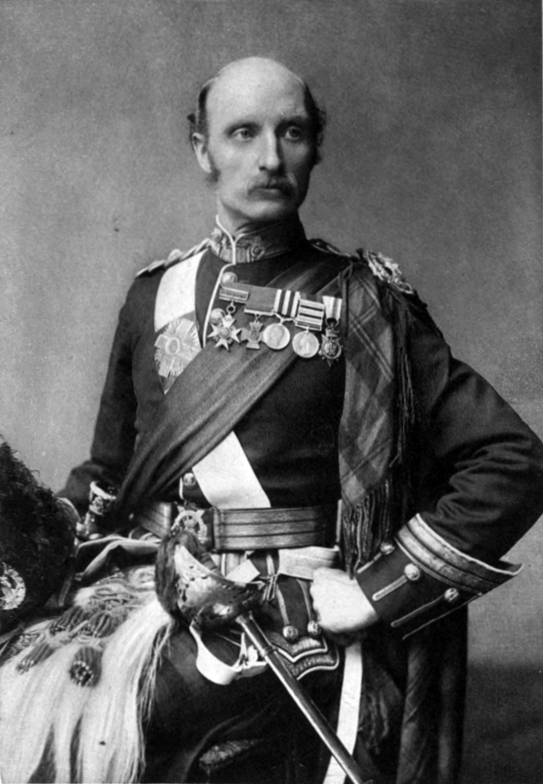
Major George Stewart White VC

- George Stuart White
- William Dick-Cunyngham
- Thomas Beach – (attached to the 55th (Westmorland) Regiment of Foot)

== Colonels of the Regiment ==
Colonels of the Regiment were:

100th (Gordon Highlanders) Regiment of Foot

- 1796–1806: Gen. George Gordon, 5th Duke of Gordon, GCB (Marquess of Huntly)

92nd (Highland) Regiment of Foot - (1798)

- 1806–1820: Gen. John Hope, 4th Earl of Hopetoun, GCB

92nd Regiment of Foot - (1809)

- 1820–1823: Lt-Gen. Sir John Hope, GCH
- 1823–1831: Gen. Hon. Sir Alexander Duff, GCH
- 1831–1842: Gen. Sir John Hamilton Dalrymple, Bt, 8th Earl of Stair, KT
- 1842–1855: Lt-Gen. Sir William Macbean, KCB
- 1855–1866: Gen. Sir John Macdonald, KCB

92nd (Gordon Highlanders) Regiment of Foot - (1861)

- 1866–1869: F.M. Sir Hugh Rose, 1st Baron Strathnairn, GCB, GCSI
- 1869–1871: Lt-Gen. John Campbell
- 1871–1880: Gen. George Staunton, CB
- 1880–1881: Gen. Mark Kerr Atherley

== Sources ==
- Cannon, Richard (1851). Historical record of the Ninety-second Regiment, originally termed "the Gordon Highlanders," and numbered the Hundredth Regiment: containing an account of the formation of the regiment in 1794, and of its subsequent services to 1850. Historical records of the British Army. Parker, Furnivall and Parker.
- Gardyne, Lieutenant-Colonel Charles Greenhill (1901). The Life of a Regiment: the History of the Gordon Highlanders. Edinburgh: D. Douglas.
- Nofi, Albert (1993). The Waterloo Campaign: June 1815. Da Capo Press. ISBN 978-0938289982.
- Summerville, Christopher (2007). Who Was Who at Waterloo: A Biography of the Battle. Pearson Education. ISBN 978-0-582-78405-5.
