= William Dick-Cunyngham =

Recipient of the Victoria Cross

William Dick-Cunyngham VC
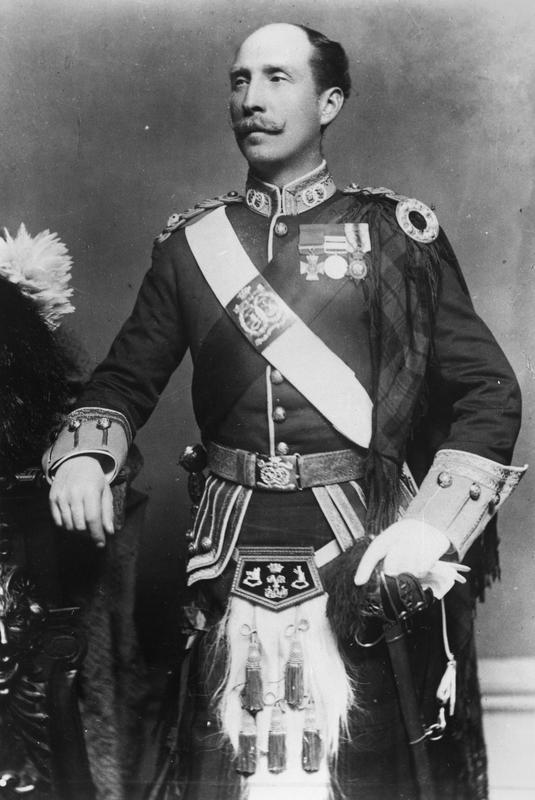
- Born: 16 June 1851; Edinburgh, Scotland
- Died: 6 January 1900 (aged 48); Ladysmith, South Africa
- Burial place: Ladysmith Cemetery
- Military career
- Allegiance: United Kingdom
- Branch: British Army
- Rank: Lieutenant colonel
- Units: The Gordon Highlanders
- Conflicts: Second Anglo-Afghan War; Second Boer War
- Awards: Victoria Cross

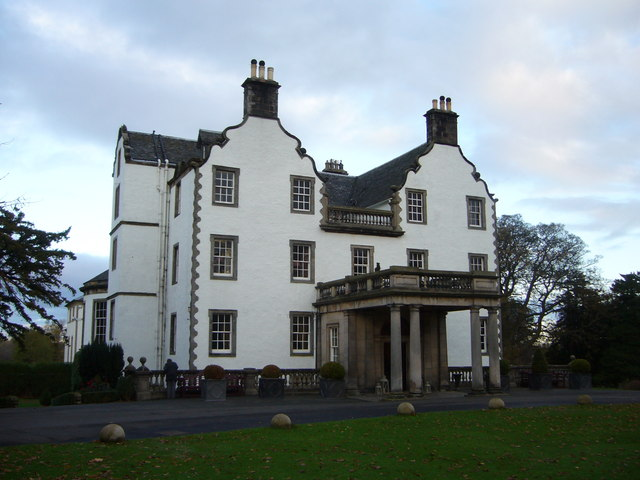
Prestonfield House

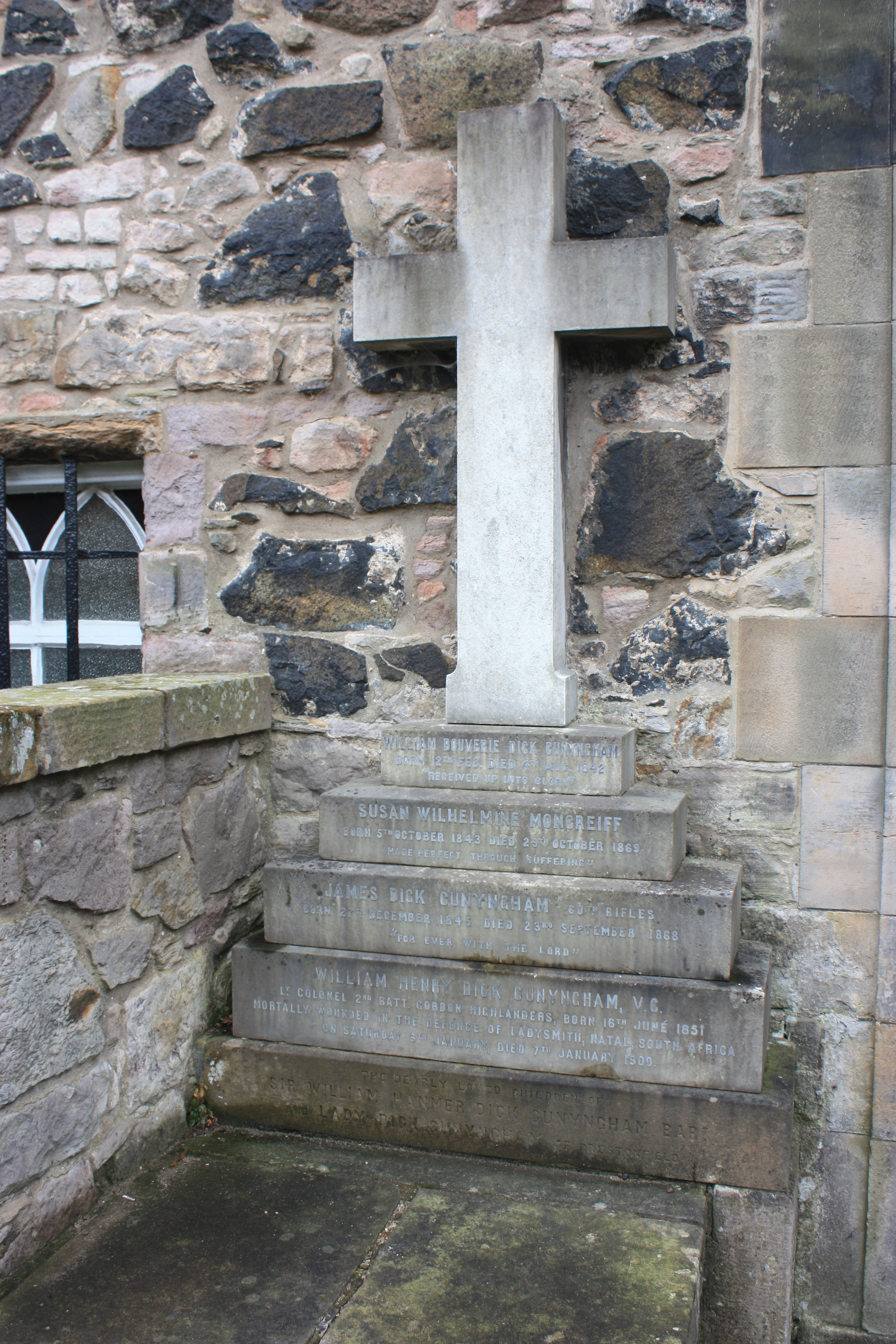
The Dick-Cunyngham memorial, Duddingston Kirkyard, Edinburgh

Lieutenant Colonel William Henry Dick-Cunyngham VC (16 June 1851 – 6 January 1900) was a Scottish recipient of the Victoria Cross, the highest and most prestigious award for gallantry in the face of the enemy that can be awarded to British and Commonwealth forces.

== Background ==
Dick-Cunynigham was the youngest son of Sir William Hanmer Dick-Cunyngham, 8th Baronet of Prestonfield and Lambrughton. The family lived at Prestonfield House in south Edinburgh.

== Military career and VC details ==
He was 28 years old, and a lieutenant in The Gordon Highlanders of the British Army during the Second Anglo-Afghan War when the following deed took place on 13 December 1879 during the attack on the Sherpur Pass, Afghanistan for which he was awarded the VC.

For the conspicuous gallantry and coolness displayed by him on the 13th December, 1879, at the attack on the Sherpur Pass, in Afghanistan, in having exposed himself to the full fire of the enemy, and by his example and encouragement rallied the men who, having been beaten back, were, at the moment, wavering at the top of the hill.

In 1899 he was appointed in command of the 2nd Battalion Gordon Highlanders, which was sent to South Africa for the Second Boer War.

While in South Africa, he was mortally wounded in action at the siege of Ladysmith on 6 January 1900 and died the following day, 7 January.

== Medal and memorials ==
His Victoria Cross is displayed at the Gordon Highlanders Museum, Aberdeen, Scotland.

His grave is in Ladysmith Cemetery in South Africa. and his name appears on the Boer War Memorial in Cheltenham England.

He is also memorialised with his siblings in Duddingston Kirkyard in Edinburgh. A memorial tablet inside the church remembers his only son, St John William Keith Dick-Cunyngham who was drowned near the family home of Philorth Castle in 1897 while trying to rescue his best friend.
