= D9 =

D9, D09, D.IX, D IX, D.9 or D-9 may refer to:

== Transport and vehicles ==
- Albatros D.IX, a 1918 German prototype single-seat fighter
- Bavarian D IX, an 1888 German steam locomotive model
- Bottineau Municipal Airport, FAA LID D09, a public airport in North Dakota, United States
- BHP Port Kembla D9 class, a class of Australian diesel-electric locomotives
- Caterpillar D9, a 1954 large bulldozer/track-type tractor
  - IDF Caterpillar D9, an armored bulldozer
- Denza D9, a minivan by BYD Auto
- Donavia, IATA code D9, a former subsidiary of Aeroflot
- D9 road (Croatia), a state road in Croatia
- HMS D9, a 1912 British E class submarine
- HMS Imperial (D09), a 1936 British Royal Navy I-class destroyer
- HMS Trumpeter (D09), a 1942 British Royal Navy escort aircraft carrier
- Jodel D9, a 1948 French single-seat ultralight monoplane
- LNER Class D9, a class of British steam locomotives

== Other uses ==
- Delta-9-THC, the delta-9 isomer of THC
- ATC code D09, Medicated dressings, a classification for medical products
- D-9 (video), a video format also known as Digital-S
- D9-brane, a class of objects in string theory
- D-IX, a Nazi performance-enhancing drug
- District 9, a 2009 film
- The "Divine Nine" (D9), nickname for the National Pan-Hellenic Council, an African American fraternities and sororities council
- Dublin 9, a Dublin, Ireland postal district
- Digital 9, a collaborative network of the world's leading digital governments
- Diensteinheit IX - a military unit of the East German police the Volkspolizei

== See also ==
- 9D (disambiguation)
- Dix (disambiguation)
