= Dixville =

Dixville may refer to:

- Dixville, New Hampshire, United States; a township
- Dixville, Quebec, Canada; a municipality
- Dixville, Liberia; a township

== See also ==
- Dix (disambiguation)
- Dix Township, Ford County, Illinois, USA
- Dixboro, Michigan, USA
- Dixton, Wales
