= Gordon Barracks =

Barracks in Aberdeen, Scotland

- Bridge of Don
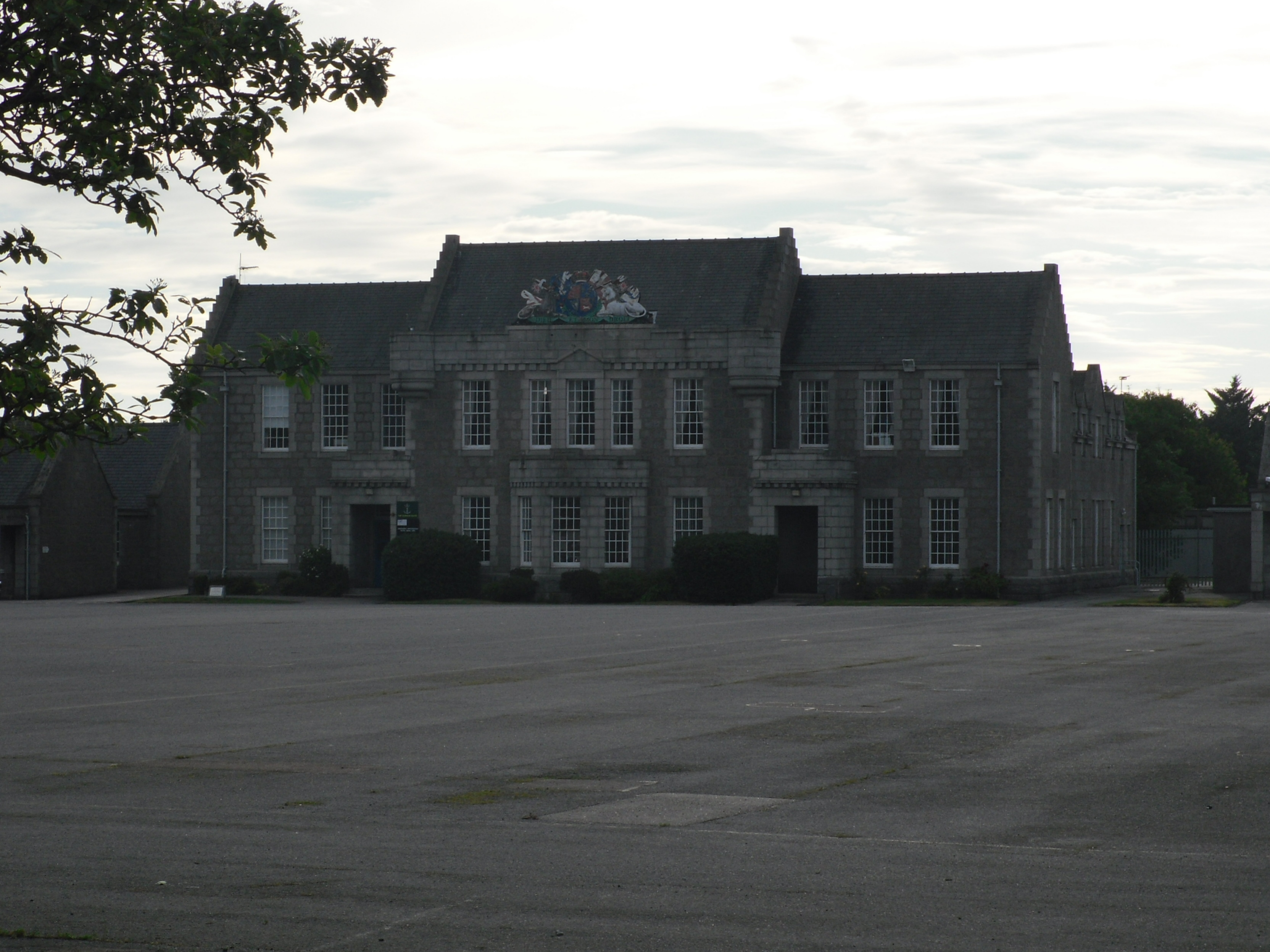
- Gordon Barracks Junior Ranks Mess

Site information
- Type: Barracks
- Owner: Ministry of Defence
- Operator: British Army

Location
- Location within Aberdeen
- Coordinates: 57°10′50″N 2°5′20″W

Site history
- Built: 1933–1935
- Built for: War Office
- In use: 1935 – present

Garrison information
- Occupants: Detachments from: 3 (Aberdeen & Kintore) Troop, C (Fife and Forfar Yeomanry/ Scottish Horse) Squadron, Scottish and North Irish Yeomanry; 7th Battalion the Royal Regiment of Scotland; 32 Signal Regiment; 215 (Scottish) Multirole Medical Regiment, Royal Army Medical Corps; Aberdeen University Officers' Training Corps; Aberdeen Detachment, Royal Marines Reserve Scotland

Gordon Barracks is a military installation situated in Bridge of Don, Aberdeen.

== History ==
The barrack buildings, which were built by J and W Wittet between 1933 and 1935, are located around the barrack square.

Constructed of dressed granite blocks, the two-storey central block, once used as the Junior Ranks Club, is typical of the style with three bays and being rectangular in shape. The roof is crowstepped and slated. It has very grand Royal coated arms tripartite above with pediment detail. Other listed buildings include: the Medical Reception Centre, three barracks blocks, the Guard Room, Gate Piers and Gates, Married Quarters, the Officers Mess and the Gymnasium. The barracks became the depot of the Gordon Highlanders, who had relocated from Castlehill Barracks, as soon as they opened in 1935.

The barracks became the regional centre for infantry training as the Highland Brigade Depot in 1960. In 1970, following the formation of the Scottish Division, adult Highland Brigade recruits removed to The Scottish Division Depot at Glencorse Barracks, Penicuik. Junior soldiers from the Lowland Brigade moved from Glencorse to Gordon Barracks on the same day. The barracks closed to Junior Soldier training in 1986.

Gordon Barracks are now used by a variety of organisations, including Army Reserve infantry, signals and medical units, and Royal Marines Reserve.

== Based units ==
The following units are based at Gordon Barracks.

British Army

- 3 (Aberdeen & Kintore) Troop, C (Fife and Forfar Yeomanry/Scottish Horse) Squadron, the Scottish and North Irish Yeomanry
- Detachment, A Company, 51st Highland, 7th Battalion, Royal Regiment of Scotland
- 851 Troop, 2 Signal Squadron, 32 Signal Regiment
- A Detachment, 215 (Scottish) Multirole Medical Regiment, Royal Army Medical Corps
- Aberdeen University Officers' Training Corps

His Majesty's Naval Service

- Aberdeen Detachment, Royal Marines Reserve Scotland
