= Castlehill Barracks =

Military installation in Aberdeen, Scotland

- Aberdeen, Scotland
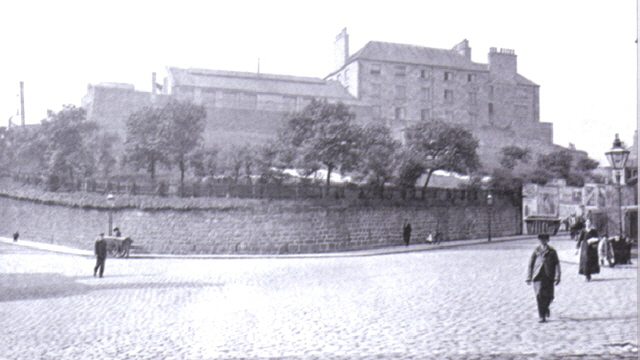
- Castlehill Barracks

Site information
- Type: Barracks
- Owner: Ministry of Defence
- Operator: British Army

Location
- Location within Aberdeen
- Coordinates: 57.14886°N 2.09059°W

Site history
- Built: 1764-1796
- Built for: War Office
- In use: 1796-1935

Garrison information
- Garrison: Gordon Highlanders

Castlehill Barracks was a military installation in Aberdeen in Scotland.

== History ==
The barracks, which were built on the site of a 12th-century castle, were completed in response to a perceived threat from France between 1764 and 1796. In 1873 a system of recruiting areas based on counties was instituted under the Cardwell Reforms and the barracks became the depot for the 92nd (Gordon Highlanders) Regiment of Foot and the 93rd (Sutherland Highlanders) Regiment of Foot. Following the Childers Reforms, the 75th (Stirlingshire) Regiment of Foot amalgamated with the 92nd (Gordon Highlanders) Regiment of Foot to form the Gordon Highlanders with its depot in the barracks in 1881. A major extension in the form of a large new block was built to accommodate the new depot between 1880 and 1881.

The barracks fell into a state of disrepair in the early part of the 20th century. They were withdrawn from military use in 1935 when the Gordon Highlanders moved to Gordon Barracks at Bridge of Don and were used as emergency housing in the 1940s and 1950s. The barracks were ultimately demolished in 1965 to make way for the Marischal Court and Virginia Court flats.
