= Gordon Highlanders =

Military unit in the British Army

- Cap badge of the Gordon Highlanders
- Active: 1881–1994 (as Gordon Highlanders)
- Country: United Kingdom
- Branch: British Army
- Type: Infantry
- Size: Line infantry
- Part of: Scottish Division
- Garrison/HQ: Castlehill Barracks, Aberdeen (1881–1935); Gordon Barracks, Bridge of Don (1935–94)
- Motto: Bydand
- March: Cock o' the North
- Engagements: Mysore; Seringapatam; Peninsular War; Second Boer War; Malayan Emergency; Cyprus Emergency
- Battle honours: Relief of Ladysmith; Battle of Kandahar

Commanders
- Last Colonel-in-Chief: HRH The Duke of Rothesay

Insignia
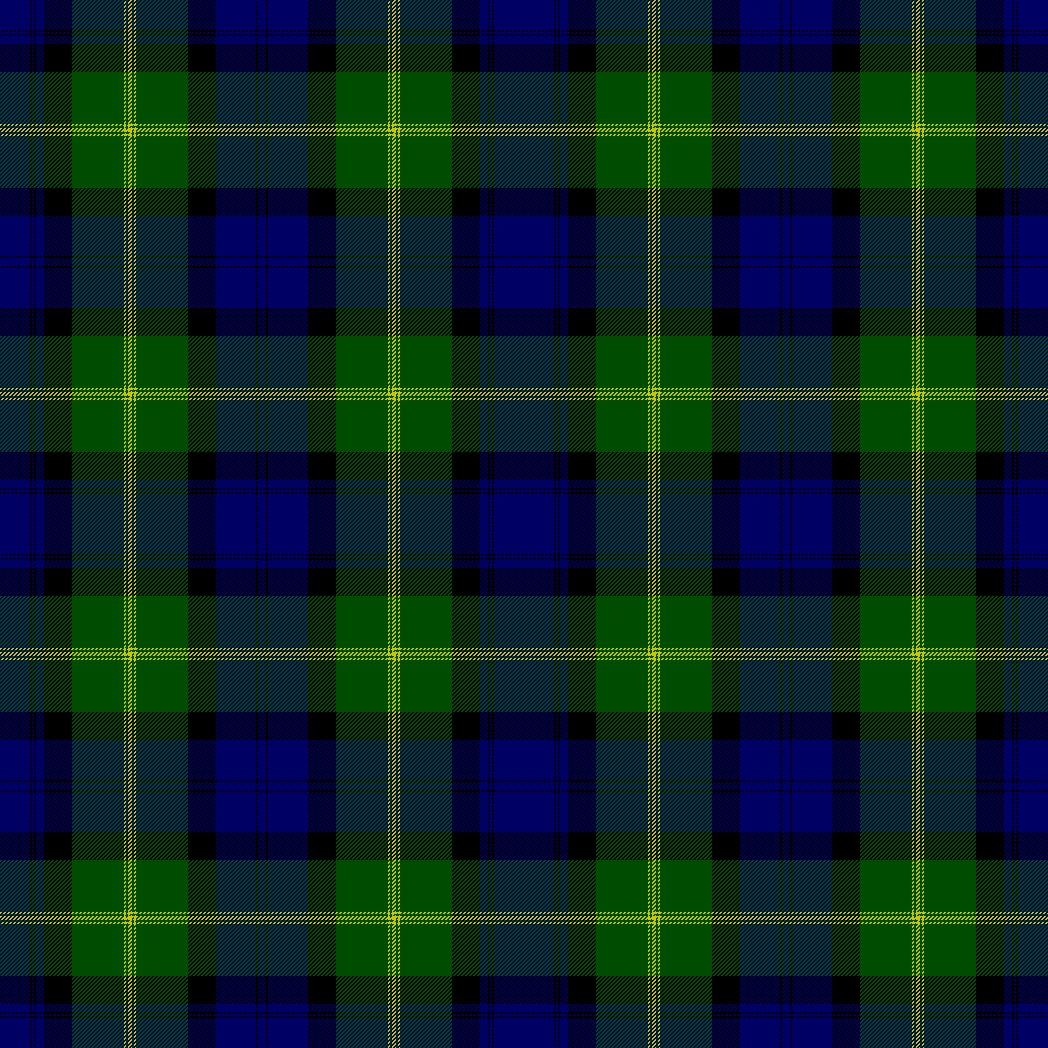
- Tartan

The Gordon Highlanders was a line infantry regiment of the British Army that existed for 113 years, from 1881 until 1994, when it was amalgamated with The Queen's Own Highlanders (Seaforth and Camerons) to form The Highlanders (Seaforth, Gordons and Camerons). Although the 'Gordon Highlanders' had existed as the 92nd (Gordon Highlanders) Regiment of Foot since 1794, the actual 'Gordon Highlanders Regiment' was formed in 1881 by amalgamation of the 75th (Stirlingshire) Regiment of Foot and 92nd (Gordon Highlanders) Regiment of Foot.

== History ==
=== Early history ===
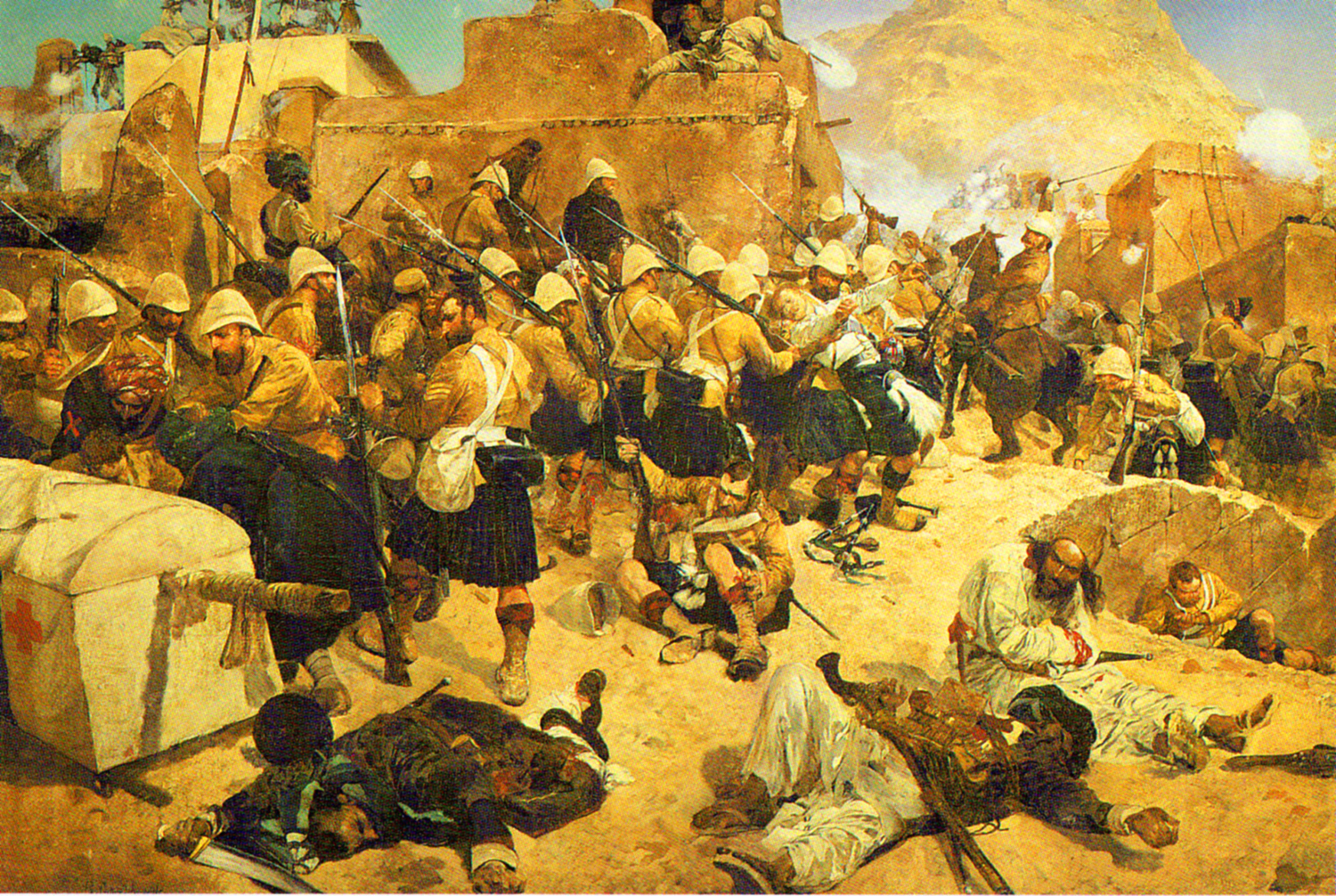
92nd Highlanders at Kandahar by Richard Caton Woodville (1856–1927)

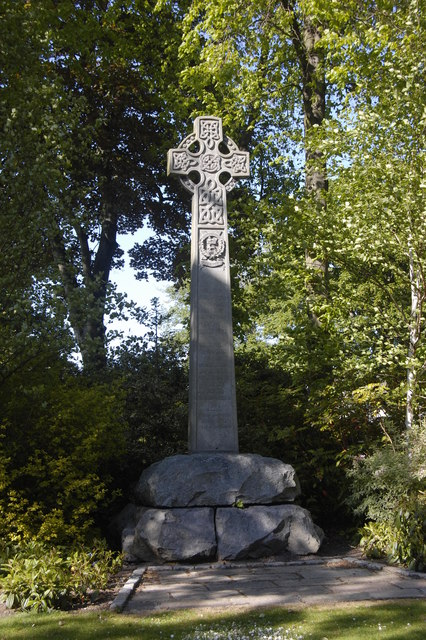
Monument in Aberdeen to the Gordon Highlanders who fell in the Anglo-Egyptian War

The regiment was formed on 1 July 1881 instigated under the Childers Reforms as the county regiment of: Aberdeenshire, Banffshire, and Shetland. Although the regiment was formed by two regular regiments, it in fact controlled other units which were of the former Militia and Volunteer Force, including:

- Regimental Headquarters & Regimental Depot at Castlehill Barracks
- 1st Battalion (Regular, former 75th (Stirlingshire) Regiment of Foot)
- 2nd Battalion (Regular, former 92nd (Gordon Highlanders) Regiment of Foot)
- 3rd (Royal Aberdeenshire Highland Militia) Battalion (Militia) based at the King Street Barracks in Aberdeen
- 1st Volunteer Battalion (Volunteers, former 1st Aberdeenshire Rifle Volunteer Corps, became 1st VB in 1884), later became 4th (City of Aberdeen) Btn
- 2nd Volunteer Battalion (Volunteers, former 2nd Aberdeenshire Rifle Volunteer Corps, became 2nd VB in 1884), later became 5th (Buchan and Formartin) Btn
- 3rd (The Buchan) Volunteer Battalion (Volunteers, former 3rd Aberdeenshire Rifle Volunteer Corps)
- 4th Volunteer Battalion (Volunteers, former 4th Aberdeenshire Rifle Volunteer Corps), later became 6th (The Banff and Donside) Btn
- 5th (Deeside Highland) Volunteer Battalion (Volunteers, former 1st (Deeside Highland) Kincardineshire and Aberdeenshire Rifle Volunteer Corps), later became 7th (Deeside Highland) Btn

The 1st Battalion fought at the Battle of Tel el-Kebir in September 1882 during the Anglo-Egyptian War, in the Eastern Sudan in 1884 under Sir Gerald Graham (battles of El Teb and Tamaii) and then took part in the Nile Expedition in an attempt to relieve Major-General Charles Gordon during the Mahdist War.

The 1st Battalion then took part in the Chitral Expedition and then the Tirah Campaign; it was during operations on the North West Frontier in October 1897, during the storming of the Dargai Heights, that one of the regiment's most famous Victoria Crosses was earned. Piper George Findlater, despite being wounded in both legs, continued to play the bagpipes during the assault. Other heroes involved in the charge of the Gordon Highlanders at Dargai Heights were Pipers John Kidd and James Fraser. Piper Kidd was with Piper Findlater when, half-way up the heights, both pipers were shot down. Unmindful of his injuries, Piper Kidd sat up and continued to play "The Cock o' the North" as the troops advanced up the heights. Piper Fraser made it to the top of the heights with his pipes before he too was shot in the leg.

Both battalions were sent to South Africa following the outbreak of the Second Boer War in 1899. The 2nd Battalion fought at the Battle of Elandslaagte in October 1899 and was part of the force besieged in the Siege of Ladysmith in November 1899. Meanwhile, the 1st Battalion, which arrived a little later, saw action at the Battle of Magersfontein in December 1899 and at the successful action at Paardeberg in February. The battalion was again in action at Doornkop, where they suffered severe losses, in May 1900. The battalion stayed in South Africa throughout the war, which ended with the Peace of Vereeniging in May 1902. Four months later, 475 officers and men of the 1st battalion left Cape Town on the SS Salamis in late September 1902, arriving at Southampton in late October, when the battalion was posted to Glasgow.

In 1908 the Volunteers and Militia were reorganised nationally, with the former becoming the Territorial Force and the latter the Special Reserve; the regiment now had one Reserve and four Territorial battalions.

=== First World War ===
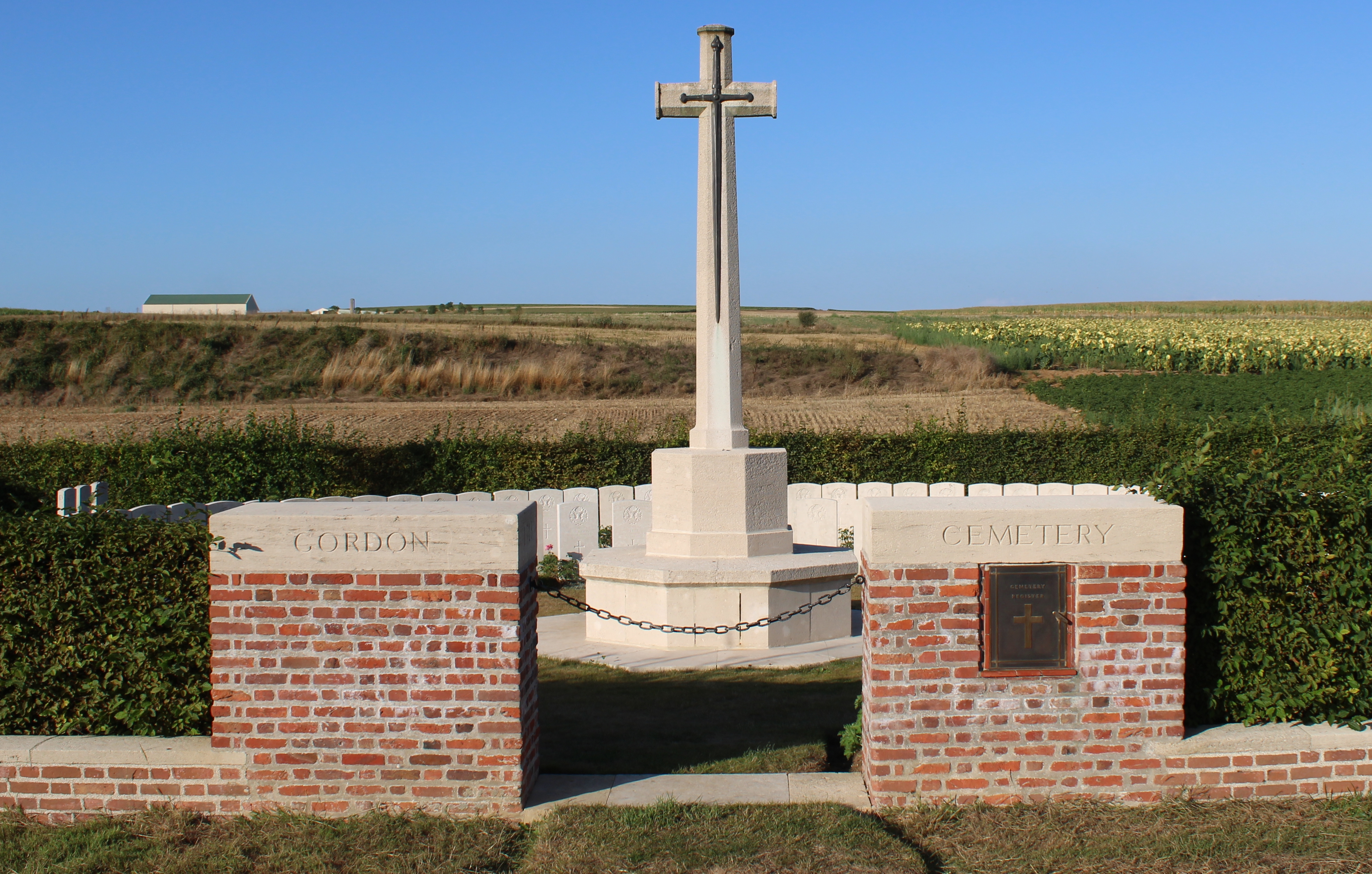
The Gordon Cemetery in Mametz, Somme

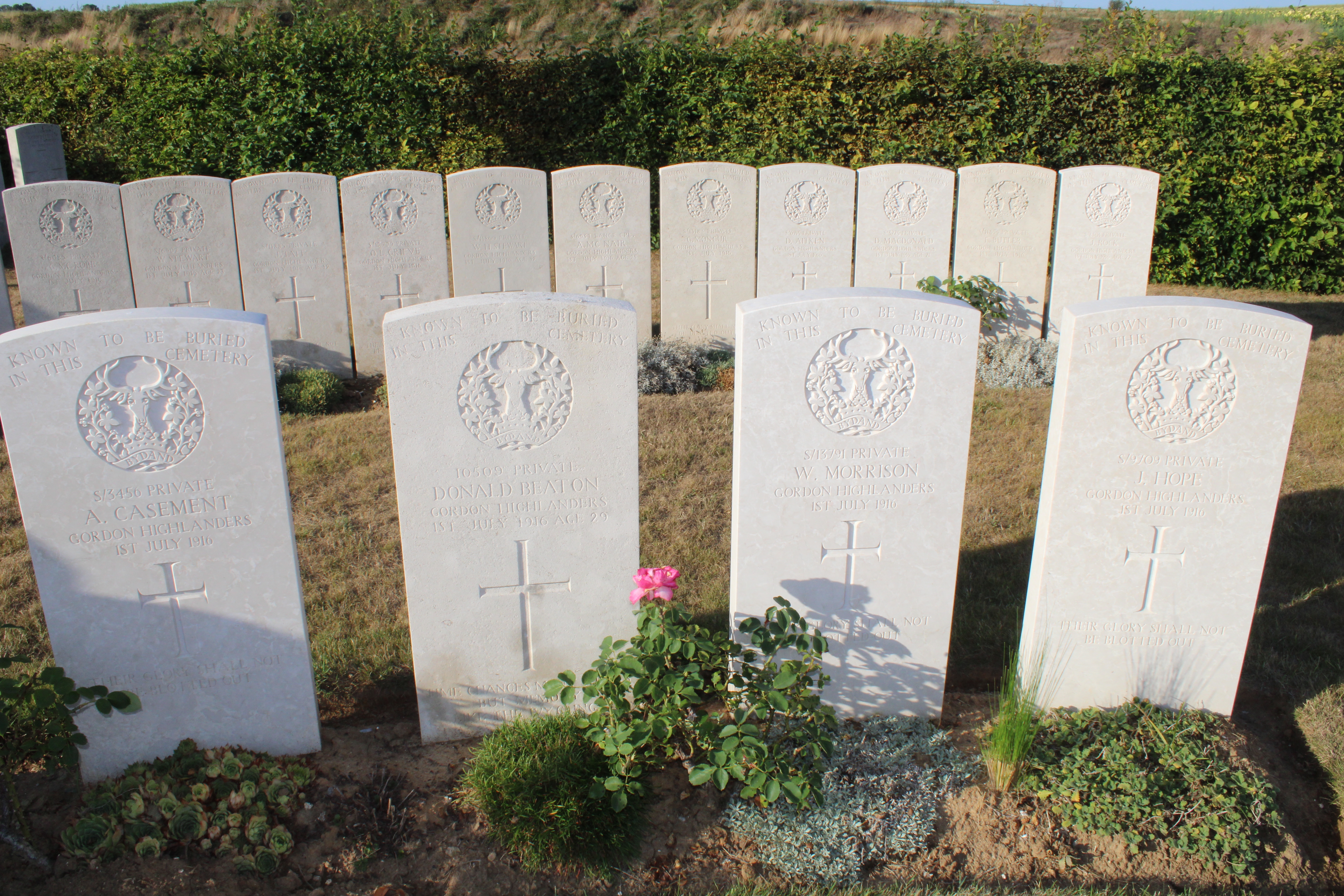
Soldiers of the Gordon Highlanders all fallen on 1 July 1916, the first day of the Battle of the Somme

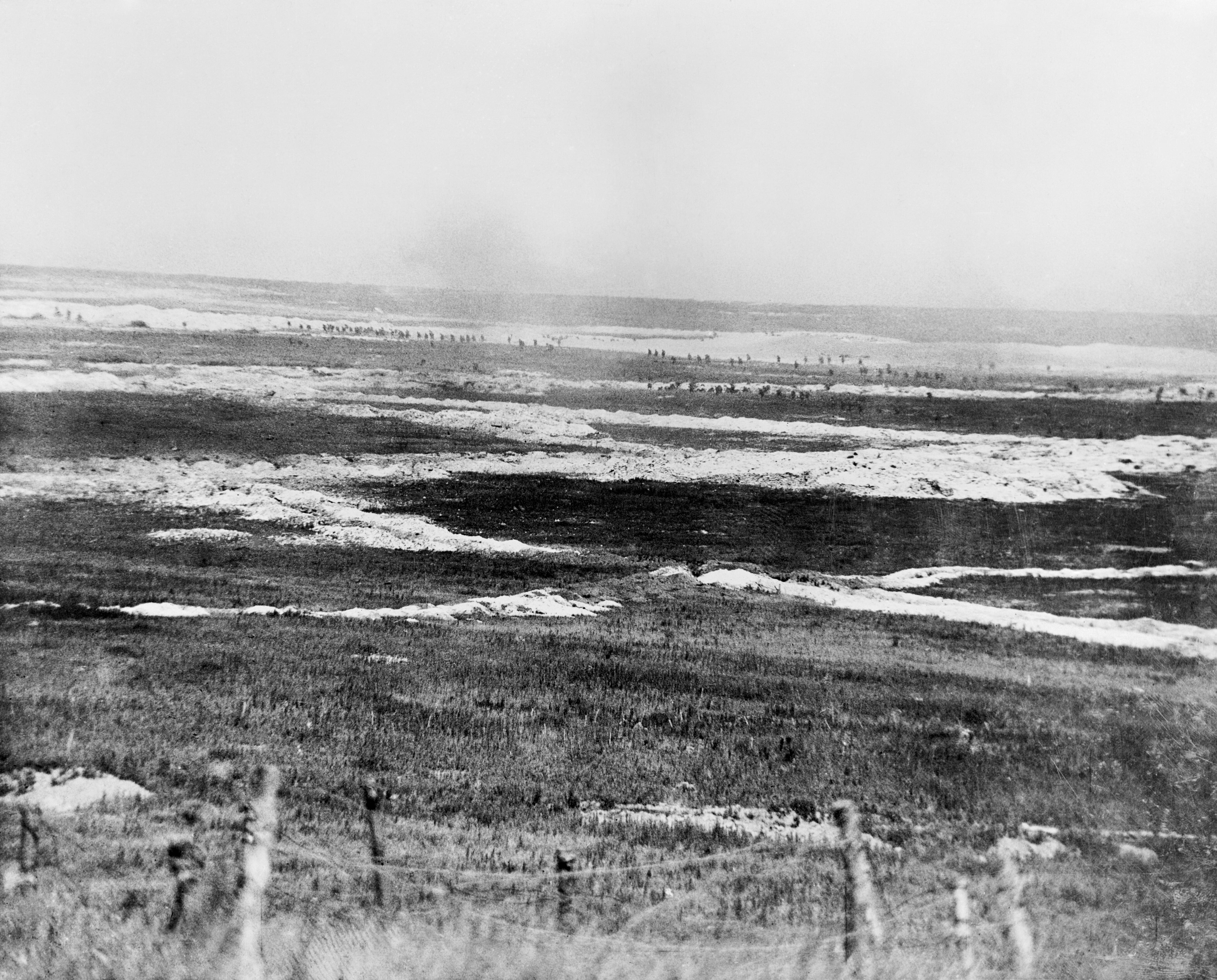
British troops, believed to be the 2nd Battalion, The Gordon Highlanders (20th Brigade, British 7th Division) crossing no man's land near Mametz on 1 July 1916, the first day of the Battle of the Somme.

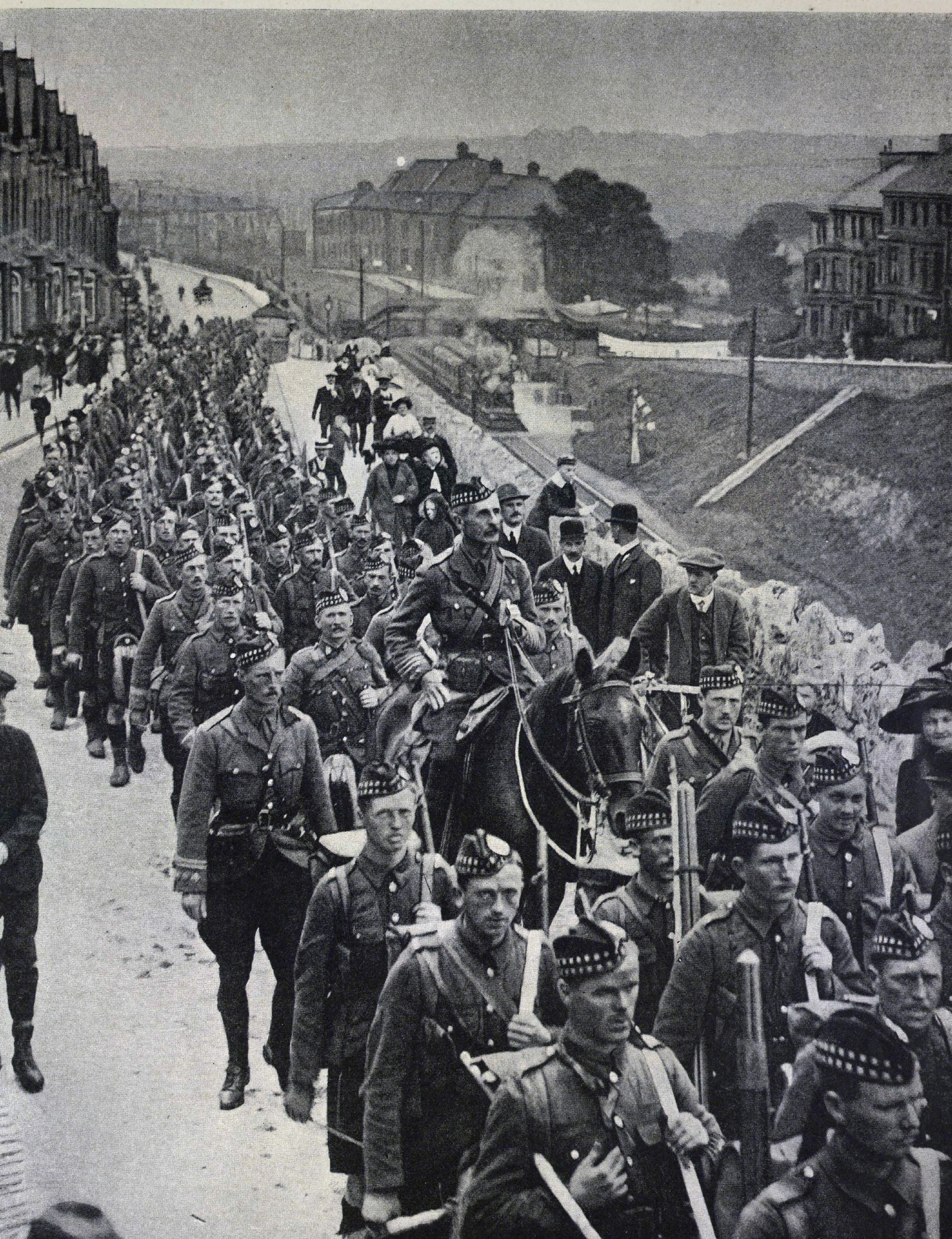
Gordon Highlanders (Plymouth, 1914)

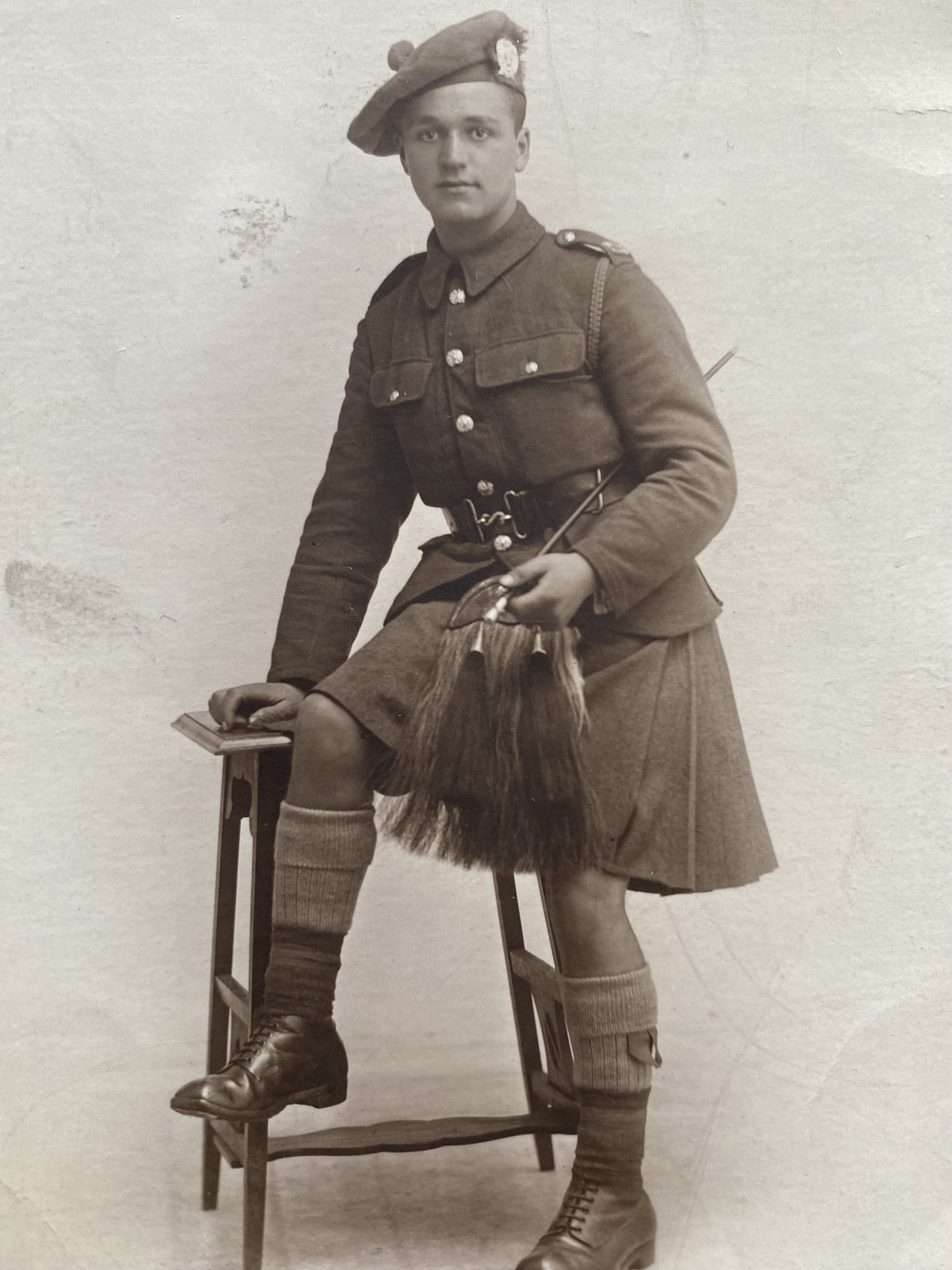
Private Ernest John Lockwood (1899–1980) dressed in Gordon Highlanders' fatigues, 1917

==== Regular Army ====
The 1st Battalion was based in Plymouth on outbreak of war and landed at Boulogne-sur-Mer as part of the 8th Brigade in the 3rd Division in August 1914. It was immediately engaged with the Germans at the Battle of Mons, suffering only slight casualties. The battalion was next in action at the Battle of Le Cateau after which it ceased to exist as a fighting force when most personnel were captured in the confusion of disengaging after battle. The order for withdrawal had only reached a single Company and consequently the rest of the battalion, with troops from other attached Units, were late to disengage from the front line. During the night-time withdrawal, a German force was encountered and the force surrendered after a sharp action. The battalion was subsequently rebuilt with drafts of reinforcements and served on the Western Front for the duration of the war.

The 2nd Battalion was in Egypt in 1914, but returned to England and landed at Zeebrugge as part of the 20th Brigade in the 7th Division in October 1914. It immediately saw action in the First Battle of Ypres. The battalion subsequently served on the Western Front until November 1917 when it moved with XIV Corps to Italy. It was subsequently involved in the final, successful, battle of the war in Italy at the Battle of Vettorio Veneto, October to November 1918.

==== Territorial Force ====
The 1/4th (City of Aberdeen) Battalion landed at Le Havre as part of the 8th Brigade in the 3rd Division in February 1915 for service on the Western Front. The 1/5th (Buchan and Formartin) Battalion landed at Boulogne-sur-Mer as part of the 153rd Brigade in the 51st (Highland) Division in May 1915 for service on the Western Front. The 1/6th (Banff and Donside) Battalion landed at Le Havre as part of the 20th Brigade in the 7th Division for service on the Western Front. One of the longest 1914 Christmas truces was upheld by this battalion: it lasted until the afternoon of 3 January 1915. The 1/7th (Deeside Highland) Battalion landed at Boulogne-sur-Mer as part of the 153rd Brigade in the 51st (Highland) Division in May 1915 for service on the Western Front.

==== New Armies ====
The 8th (Service) Battalion landed at Boulogne-sur-Mer as part of the 26th Brigade in the 9th (Scottish) Division in May 1915 for service on the Western Front. The 9th (Service) Battalion and the 10th (Service) Battalion landed at Boulogne-sur-Mer as part of the 44th Brigade in the 15th (Scottish) Division in July 1915 for service on the Western Front.

Garrison Battalion

The 1st Garrison Battalion, originally raised as the 12th Battalion, was formed in October 1916 of soldiers unfit for front line duties. It was sent to India in March 1917, and was stationed in Rawalpindi from April 1919. It served in the 2nd (Rawalpindi) Division and was subsequently on operations during the Third Anglo-Afghan War.

The folk singer and Scottish Traveller Jimmy MacBeath served with the regiment during the war.

=== Second World War ===
The 1st Battalion, Gordon Highlanders was a Regular Army battalion that served originally with the 2nd Infantry Brigade, part of the 1st Infantry Division, and was sent to France in September 1939, shortly after the declaration of war, as part of the British Expeditionary Force (BEF): it remained there until May 1940. On 7 March 1940 the 1st Battalion exchanged with the Territorial Army 6th Battalion and transferred to the 153rd Infantry Brigade, part of the 51st (Highland) Division. The battalion served with the 51st Division during the Battle of France in 1940 when they were trapped and the majority of the division was forced to surrender at Saint-Valéry-en-Caux, with very few men escaping capture. The 1st Battalion was, however, reformed in the United Kingdom in August 1940 and went on to serve with the second formation of the 51st (Highland) Division (formed by redesignation of the 9th (Highland) Infantry Division throughout the rest of the Second World War, serving in North Africa at El Alamein, Tunisia, Sicily and North-western Europe, ending the war in Germany.

The 2nd Battalion was based in Malaya as part of the Singapore garrison and fought in the battle for Singapore in February 1942, surrendering along with 130,000 other British Commonwealth soldiers on 15 February. The men of this battalion suffered more casualties as prisoners of war in Japanese captivity than they did during the fighting on Singapore Island and Malaya. The 2nd Battalion was reformed in May 1942 by redesignation of the 11th Battalion, itself the former 50th Holding Battalion. The battalion became part of the 227th (Highland) Brigade in the 15th (Scottish) Division and landed in Normandy on 23 June 1944. They were involved in the heavy fighting around Cheux and Tourville-sur-Odon in Normandy, the fight for the Netherlands and in the Rhineland Campaign in Germany near to the end of the war.

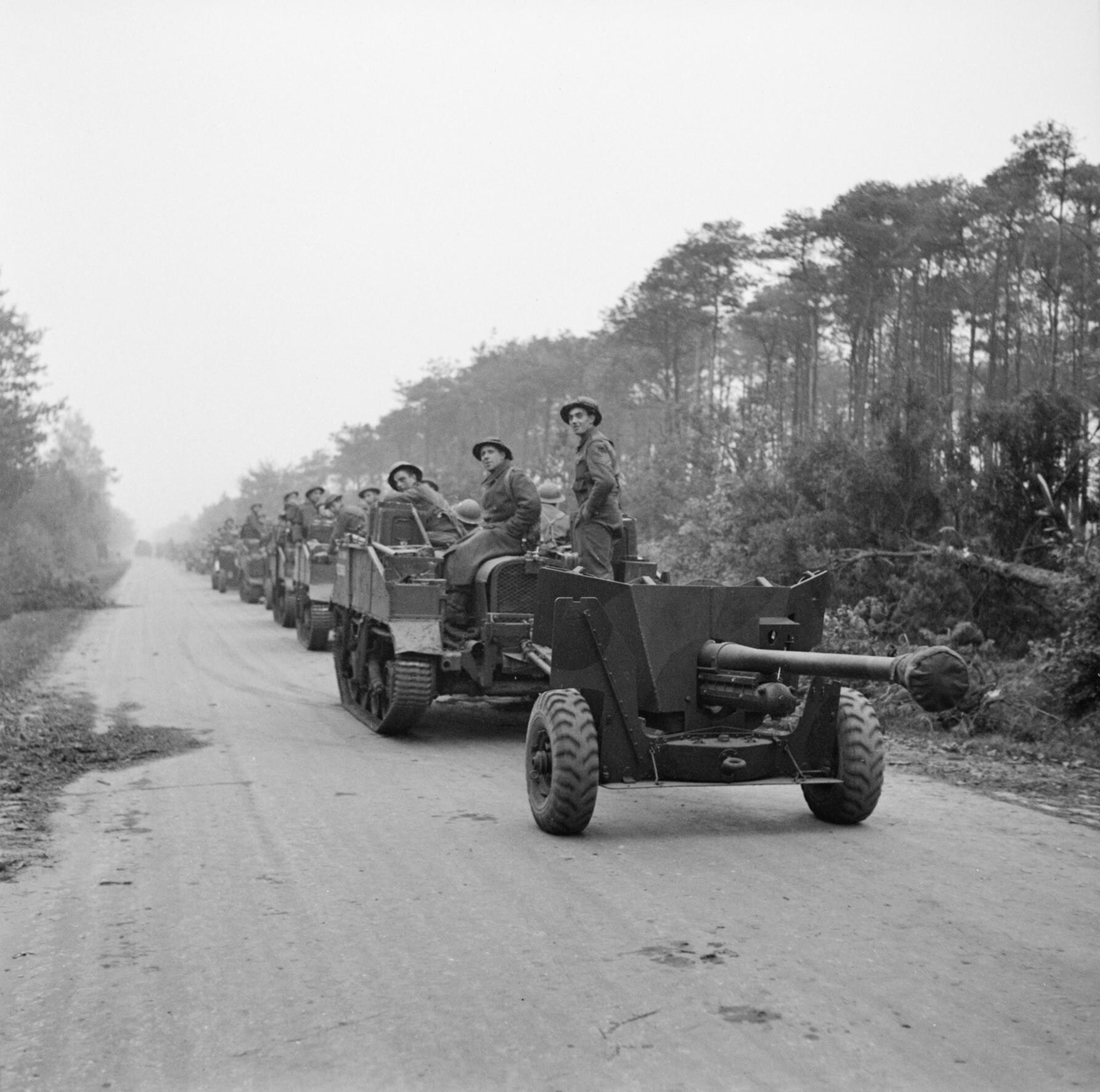
Men of the 2nd Battalion, Gordon Highlanders during the assault on Tilburg in October 1944.

The 4th (City of Aberdeen) Battalion served as a Machine Gun Battalion in the Battle of France and was later converted to a Royal Artillery regiment on 1 November 1941, becoming the 92nd Anti-Tank Regiment, Royal Artillery, as part of the 9th Armoured Division, but saw no active service during the war.

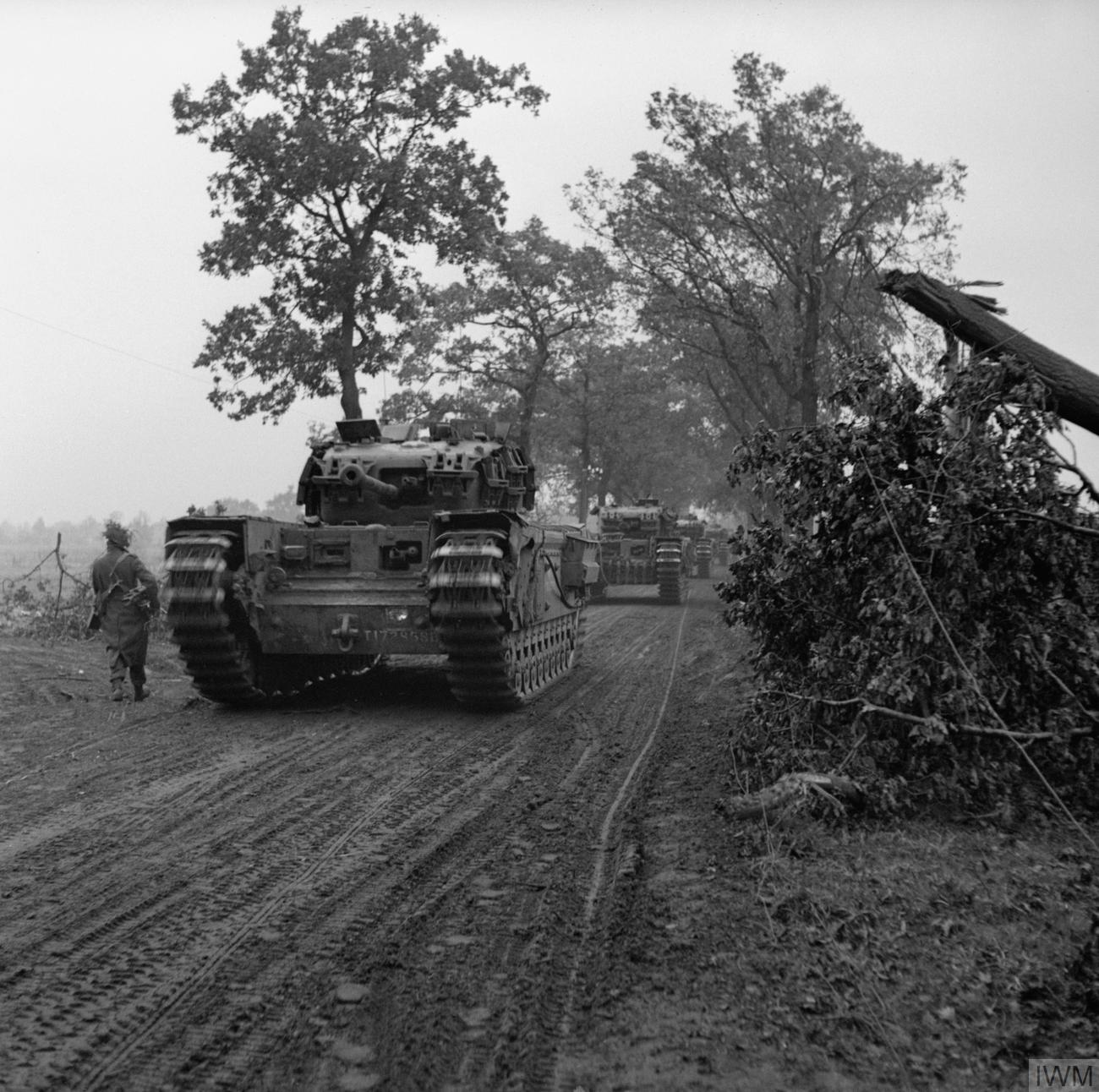
British tanks supported by men of the 2nd Battalion, Gordon Highlanders in the Netherlands in November 1944.

The 5th Battalion went to France as part of the British Expeditionary Force: they were serving as part of the 153rd Brigade in the 51st Division during the Battle of France in 1940 when they were trapped and the majority of the division was forced to surrender at Saint-Valéry-en-Caux. The 5th Battalion was, however, reformed in the United Kingdom in August 1940 at the amalgamated 5/7 Battalion, and went on to serve with the second formation of the 51st (Highland) Division (formed by redesignation of the 9th (Highland) Infantry Division throughout the rest of the Second World War, serving in North Africa and taking part in the Normandy landings.

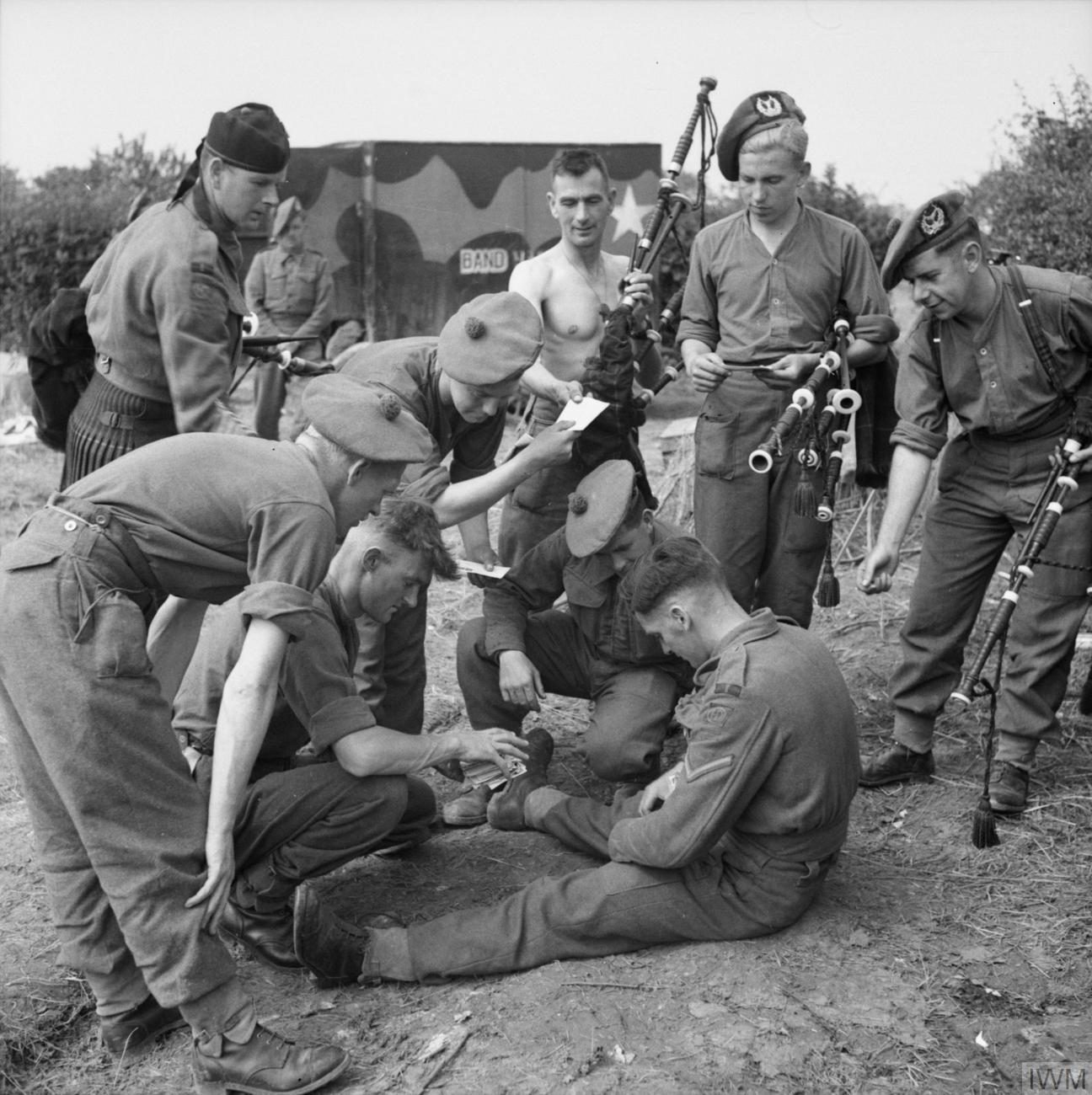
Pipers of the 5/7th Battalion, Gordon Highlanders gather round as the mail arrives, 24 July 1944.

The 6th (Banffshire) Battalion, a Territorial Army battalion, was transferred from the 153rd Brigade in the 51st (Highland) Division before it joined the 2nd Infantry Brigade of the 1st Infantry Division. It took part in the Dunkirk evacuation. The 6th Battalion fought through the Tunisian, North African and Italian campaigns, in both the Battle of Anzio and Operation Diadem, and later the Battle for the Gothic Line, before ending the war on garrison duty in Palestine.

The 7th (Mar and Mearns) Battalion amalgamated with the 5th Battalion, becoming the 5th/7th Battalion, Gordon Highlanders, and served with the second formation of the 51st (Highland) Division throughout the war.

The 8th (City of Aberdeen) Battalion was also converted to artillery, becoming the 100th Anti-Tank Regiment, Royal Artillery. This battalion served with the 2nd Infantry Division in the Burma Campaign.

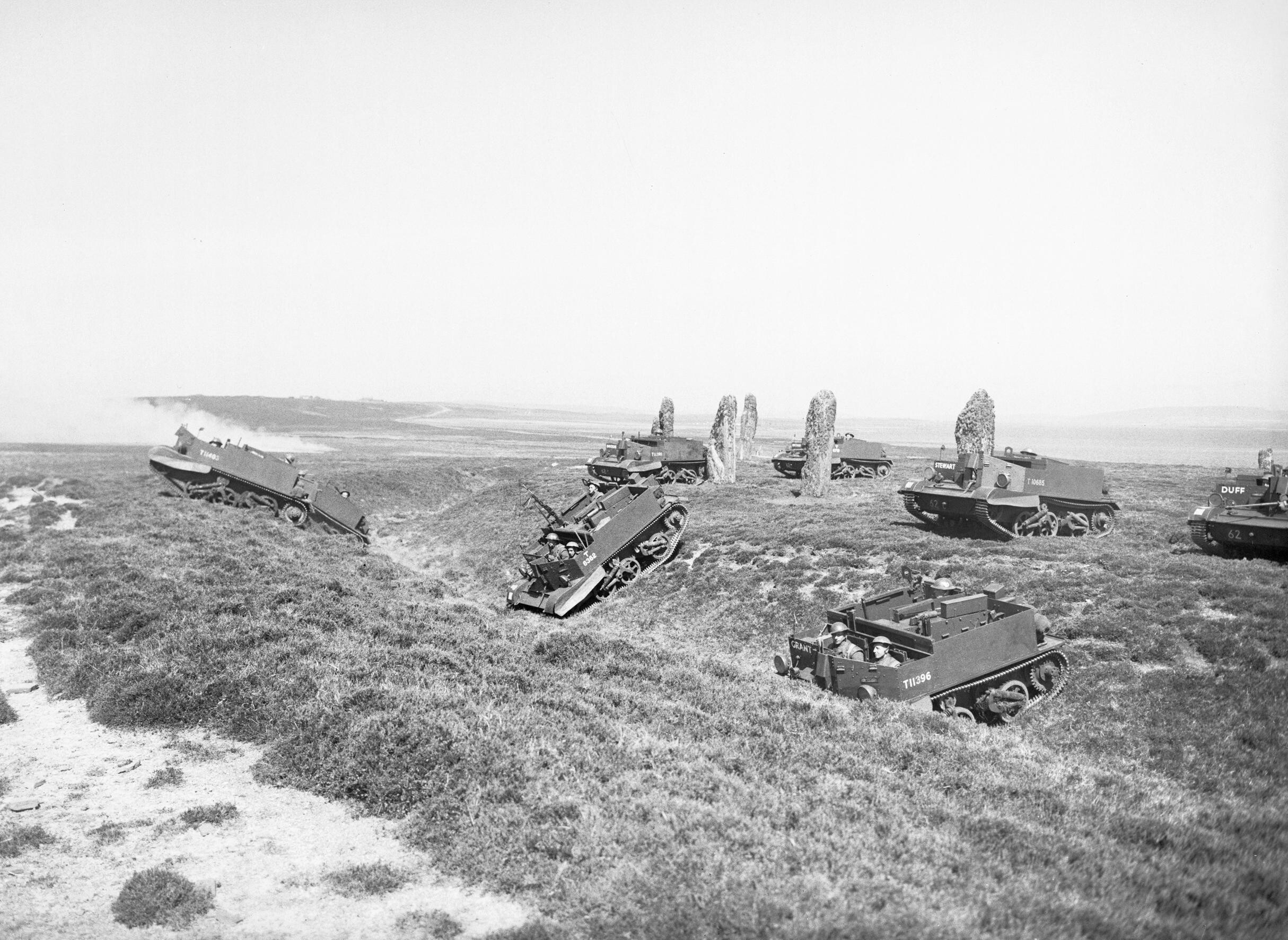
Bren gun carriers of the 9th Battalion, Gordon Highlanders pass between the prehistoric standing stones of the Ring of Brodgar on Orkney, 18 June 1941.

The 9th (Strathbogie, Garioch and Strathdon) Battalion (originally part of the 9th (Highland) Infantry Division) were recruited by the surplus men of the 6th Battalion. The battalion garrisoned the Orkney Islands 1940–1941 before moving to Northeast England. They were warned for service in the Far East and eventually sailed for India in May 1942. By July 1942, the battalion was based in Sialkot when it was announced that the unit was to convert to an armoured regiment as the 116th Regiment (Gordon Highlanders) Royal Armoured Corps. The Regiment continued to wear the Gordons cap badge and Tam o'Shanter, tartan flashes and retained kilts and their Pipe Band. The 116th Regiment RAC became part of the 255th Indian Tank Brigade in the 44th Indian Armoured Division. They deployed to Burma in December 1944, and were heavily engaged in the Battle of Meiktila and Mandalay, resulting in the decisive defeat of Japanese forces in Burma.

=== Post-War ===
After the war the Gordons saw active service in the Malayan Emergency, Cyprus, and Northern Ireland. The regiment was amalgamated with The Queens' Own Highlanders (Seaforth and Camerons) on 17 September 1994 to form the Highlanders (Seaforth, Gordons and Camerons). In 1997, the Gordon Highlanders Museum opened, in the former Regimental Headquarters in Aberdeen.

== Victoria Cross recipients ==
- Edward Lawson (India, 1897)
- George Findlater (India, 1897)
- Maury Meiklejohn (Second Boer War, 1899)
- William Robertson (Second Boer War, 1899)
- Ernest Towse (Second Boer War, 1900)
- John Mackay (Second Boer War, 1900)
- William Gordon (Second Boer War, 1900)
- David Younger (Second Boer War, 1900)
- William Kenny (France, 1914)
- James Brooke (France, 1914)
- George McIntosh (France, 1917)
- Allan Ker (France, 1918)
- George Mitchell (Italy, 1944)

== Honours ==
=== Battle honours ===
Battle honours awarded to the regiment included:

- Early Wars: Mysore, South Africa 1835, Tel-El-Kebir, Egypt 1882 '84, Nile 1884–5, Chitral, Tirah, Defence of Ladysmith, Paardeberg, South Africa, 1899–1902
- The Great War: Mons, Le Cateau, Retreat from Mons, Marne 1914 '18, Aisne 1914, La Bassée 1914, Messines 1914, Armentières 1914, Ypres 1914 '15 '17, Langemarck 1914, Gheluvelt, Nonne Bosschen, Neuve Chapelle, Frezenberg, Bellewaarde, Aubers, Festubert 1915, Hooge 1915, Loos, Somme 1916, 18, Albert 1916 '18, Bazentin, Delville Wood, Pozières, Guillemont, Flers-Courcelette, Le Transloy, Ancre 1916, Arras 1917 '18, Vimy 1917, Scarpe 1917 '18, Arleux, Bullecourt, Pilckem, Menin Road, Polygon Wood, Broodseinde, Poelcapelle. Passchendaele, Cambrai 1917 '18, St. Quentin, Bapaume 1918, Rosières, Lys, Estaires, Hazebrouck, Béthune, Soissonnais-Ourcq, Tardenois, Hindenburg Line, Canal du Nord, Selle, Sambre, France and Flanders 1914–18, Piave, Vittorio Veneto, Italy 1917–18
- The Second World War: Withdrawal to Escaut, Ypres-Comines Canal, Dunkirk 1940, Somme 1940, St. Valery-en-Caux, Odon, La Vie Crossing, Lower Maas, Venlo Pocket, Rhineland, Reichswald, Cleve, Goch, Rhine, North-West Europe 1940, '44–45, El Alamein, Advance on Tripoli, Mareth, Medjez Plain, North Africa 1942–43, Landing in Sicily, Sferro, Sicily 1943, Anzio, Rome, Italy 1944–45

=== Sporting honours ===
Winner of the Irish FA Cup in 1890

== Colonels-in-Chief ==
Colonels-in-Chief were as follows:

- 1898–1910: King Edward VII
- 1937–1974: Field Marshal HRH The Lord Culloden KG KT KP GCB GCMG GCVO GCStJ PC ADC
- 1977–1994: Commander HRH The Duke of Rothesay KG KT GCB AK QSO CD PC ADC

== Regimental colonels ==
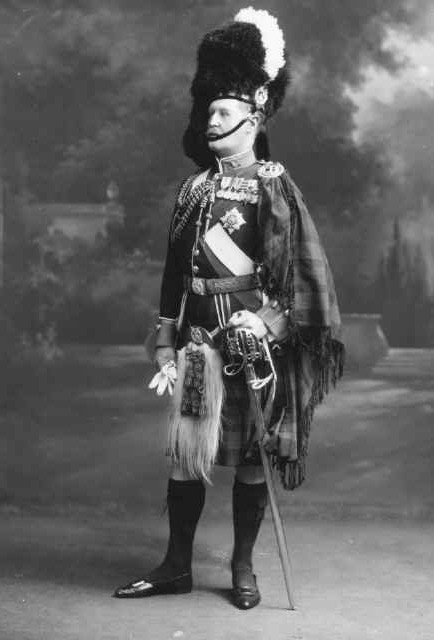
Colonel Sir Charles Whittingham Horsley Douglas, GCB

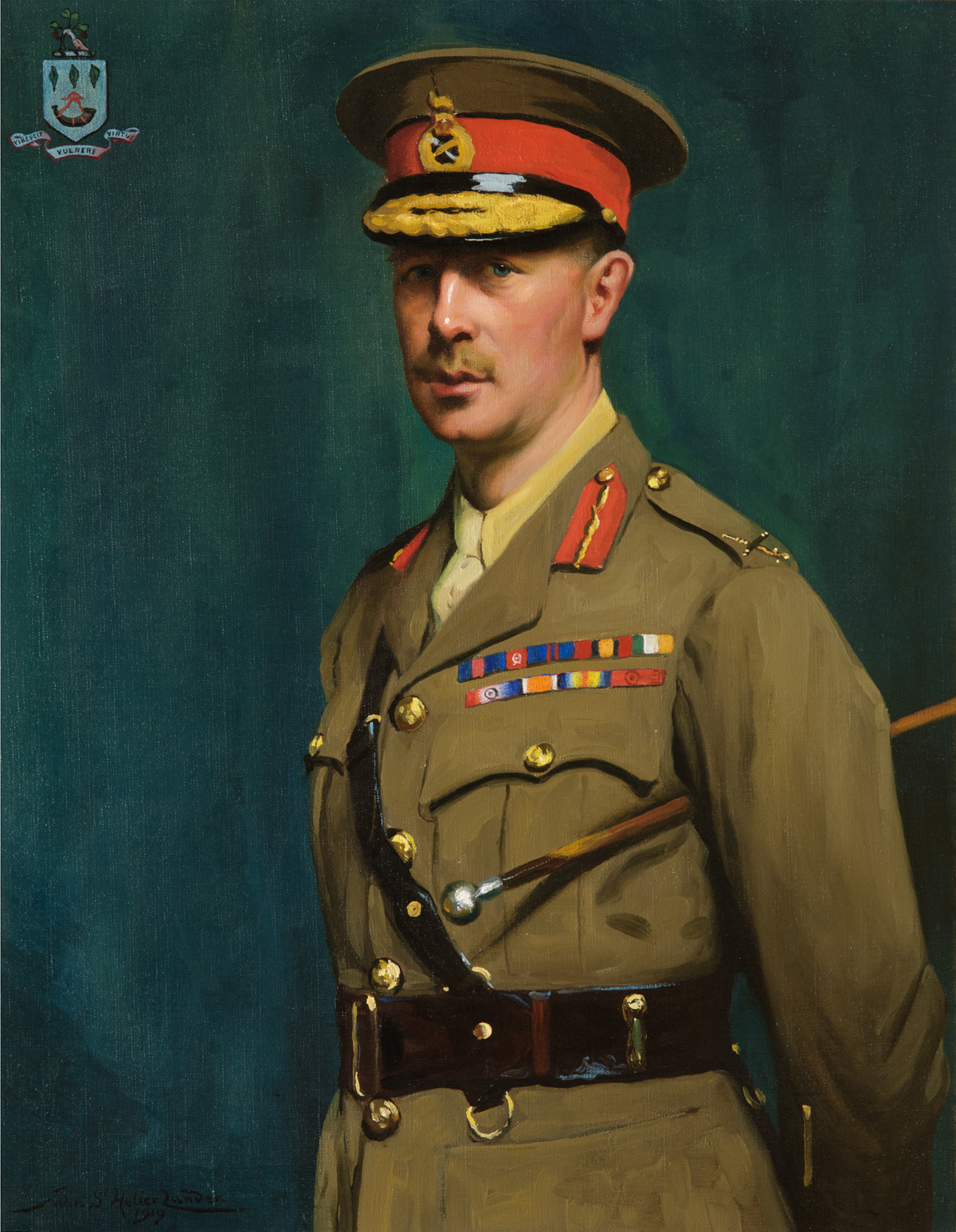
Major-General Sir James Burnett, Bt

Colonels of the regiment were:

- 1881–1890: (1st Battalion): Gen. John Thomas Hill (ex 75th (Stirlingshire) Regiment of Foot)
- 1881–1884 (2nd Battalion): Gen. Mark Kerr Atherley (ex 92nd Gordon Highlanders)
- 1884–1895 (2nd Battalion only to 1890): Gen. Sir John Alexander Ewart, KCB
- 1895–1897: Lt-Gen. Charles Edward Parke Gordon, CB
- 1897–1912: F.M. Sir George Stuart White, VC, GCB, OM, GCSI, GCMG, GCIE, GCVO
- 1912–1914: Gen. Sir Charles Whittingham Horsley Douglas, GCB
- 1914–1939: Gen. Sir Ian Standish Monteith Hamilton, GCB, GCMG, DSO, TD
- 1939–1948: Maj-Gen. Sir James Lauderdale Gilbert Burnett, Bt, CB, CMG, DSO
- 1948–1958: Col. William James Graham, MC
- 1958–1965: Brig. James Roderick Sinclair, 19th Earl of Caithness, CVO, CBE, DSO
- 1965 (May–September) vacant
- 1965–1978: Lt-Gen. Sir George C. Gordon Lennox, KBE, CB, CVO, DSO
- 1978–1986: Lt-Gen. Sir John Richard Alexander Macmillan, KCB, CBE
- 1986–1994: Lt-Gen. Sir Peter Walter Graham, KCB, CBE
- 1994: amalgamated with Queen's Own Highlanders (Seaforth and Camerons) to form The Highlanders (Seaforth, Gordons and Camerons)

== Alliances ==
Alliances were:

- Canada – The 48th Highlanders of Canada
- Canada – The Toronto Scottish Regiment (Queen Elizabeth The Queen Mother's Own)
- Australia – 5th Battalion, The Victorian Scottish Regiment
- Australia – 5th and 6th Battalions, The Royal Victoria Regiment
- Australia – 5th/7th Battalion, The Royal Australian Regiment
- South Africa – The Cape Town Highlanders
