= Edwin Asa Dix =

American writer (1860–1911)

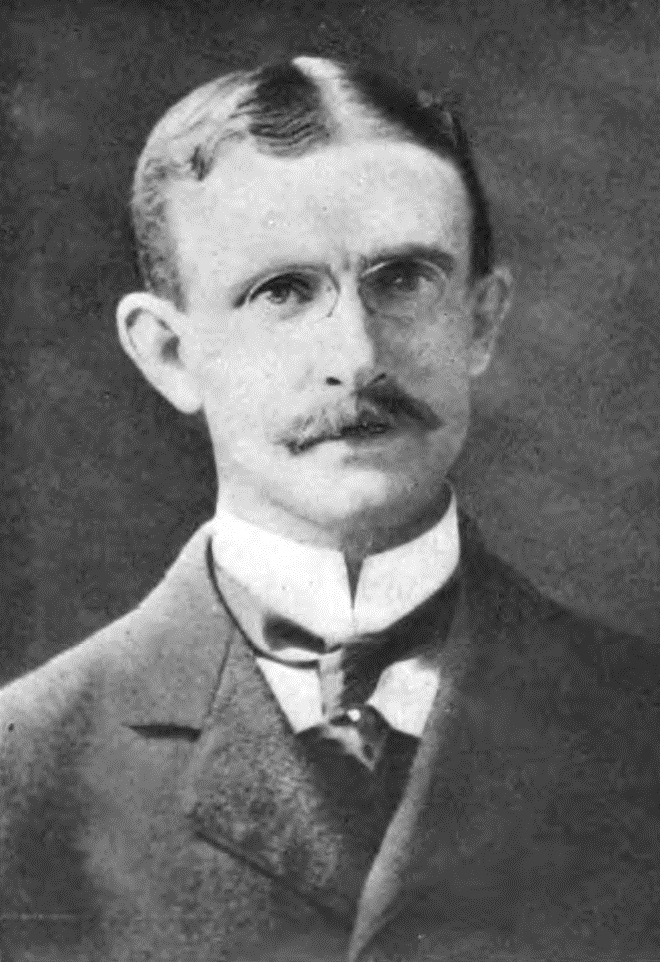

Edwin Augustus Dix (June 25, 1860 – August 24, 1911), known by his pen name Edwin Asa Dix, was an American writer.

== Biography ==
Dix was born on June 25, 1860, in Newark, New Jersey, to John Edwin and Mary Joy Dix. He attended the Newark Latin School, then Princeton University from which he graduated in 1881 as Latin Salutatorian, and first in his class with highest grade point average awarded to that date (98.5%). While at Princeton he was managing editor of The Lit and was awarded the Boudinot Historical Fellowship and other prizes. In 1884, he graduated from Columbia Law School with highest honors, and subsequently admitted to the bar in New York and New Jersey.

Dix toured the world from 1890 to 1892. On August 15, 1895, he married Marion Alden Olcott at Cherry Valley, New York. They had no children, and spent much of their married life abroad, wintering in Egypt, Switzerland, and Colorado. He died suddenly in New York City of myocarditis.

Dix was an active author of fiction and travel articles in various magazines, as well as travel books, novels, and a history of Samuel de Champlain. He also served as Literary Editor of The Churchman. In addition, he composed "Musical Critic's Dream" which was played extensively by John Philip Sousa's band.

== Selected works ==
- Works by Edwin Asa Dix at Project Gutenberg
- A midsummer drive through the Pyrenees, New York London, G.P.Putnam's sons 1890.
- Deacon Bradbury: a novel, New York, The Century Co., 1900.
- Old Bowen’s legacy: a novel, New York, The Century Co., 1901.
- Champlain, the founder of New France, New York, D. Appleton and company, 1903.
- Prophet's Landing: a novel, New York, C. Scribner's Sons, 1907.
- After twenty years, Princeton University Class of 1881. New York, 1901.
- After twenty-five years, Princeton University Class of 1881. New York, 1906.
- Bulletin of class news, Princeton University Class of 1881. New York, 1908.
