= Richard Dix (footballer) =

English footballer

Personal information
- Full name: Richard Dix
- Date of birth: 17 January 1924
- Place of birth: South Shields, England
- Date of death: 2 July 1990 (aged 66)
- Place of death: Leeds, England
- Position: Left winger

Senior career*
Years	Team	Apps	(Gls)
- South Shields United
- North Shields
1946–1948	Bradford Park Avenue	18	(5)
1948–1952	King's Lynn		
1952–1953	Bradford City	8	(1)
- Goole Town
- Dartford
- Scarborough
Total		26+	(6+)
- * Club domestic league appearances and goals

Richard Dix (17 January 1924 – 2 July 1990) was an English professional footballer who played as a left winger.

== Career ==
Dix was born in South Shields in 1924. Dix played for South Shields United. North Shields, Bradford Park Avenue, King's Lynn, Bradford City, Goole Town. Dartford and Scarborough.

He played for Bradford City between August 1952 and July 1953, scoring 1 goal in 8 appearances in the Football League for them.

== Sources ==
- Frost, Terry (1988). Bradford City A Complete Record 1903-1988. Breedon Books Sport. ISBN 0-907969-38-0.
