= William Dix =

William Dix may refer to:

- William Chatterton Dix (1837–1898), British composer
- William S. Dix (1910–1978), Princeton University librarian
- Bill Dix, US politician
- Bill Dix (rugby union), rugby union player who represented Australia
- William Dix (MP), Member of Parliament for New Shoreham
- William Peirce Dix (1853–1924), English football administrator and FA Cup referee

== See also ==
- William Dick (disambiguation)
