= Gordon Highlanders Museum =

Military museum in Aberdeen, Scotland

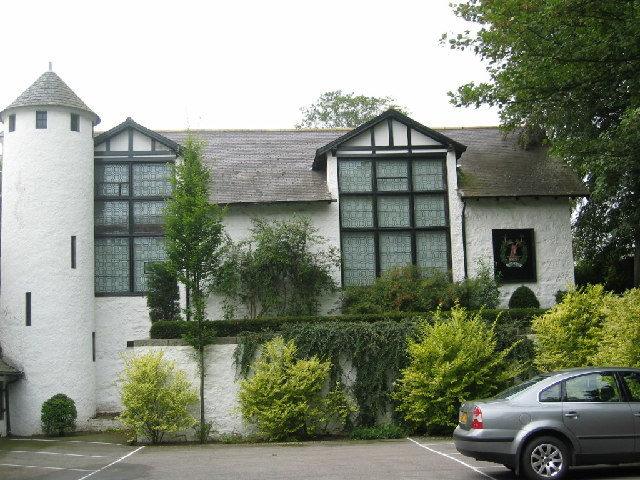
- Gordon Highlanders Museum

- Museum location in Aberdeen
- Established: 1997
- Location: Aberdeen
- Coordinates: 57.1376°N 2.1464°W
- Type: Military museum
- Website: www.gordonhighlanders.com

The Gordon Highlanders Museum is based in Aberdeen, Scotland and celebrates the story of the Gordon Highlanders regiment, which originated as the 92nd (Gordon Highlanders) Regiment of Foot in 1794, merged with the 75th (Stirlingshire) Regiment of Foot to form the Gordon Highlanders in 1881 and was then amalgamated into a new larger unit of the British Army in 1994. It is a five-star VisitScotland attraction and the only one of its kind in Aberdeen.

== History ==
The museum is located in a 19th-century house which was purchased by the Scottish artist, Sir George Reid in 1867, and in which he lived and worked. It was acquired by the War Office in 1960 to be the regimental headquarters and then, after being transferred to the ownership of the trustees of the regiment in 1994, it was extended and re-opened as a museum in 1997.

== Location and facilities ==
The museum is located in an angle of Viewfield Road, near a stream. It has a tea room facility, a volunteer-maintained garden, and both the museum and the garden can be rented as event venues.

== The collection ==
The museum contains historical artefacts, memorabilia and regimental silverware. Within the building are a main gallery - the Grant Room - and a display of edged weapons and guns in the Armoury, along with a mock-up of the Regimental Officers' Mess, a Silver Room and a temporary exhibition space. Works by Sir George Reid are on loan from Aberdeen Art Gallery, and are displayed in various locations. A replica of a First World War trench was opened in 2019, and a 50% growth in visitor numbers followed. The Moffat Trench project won a tourism award at the end of 2019.

== Operations ==
The museum is independent, self-financed and is governed by a charitable trust. Senior staff include the CEO and a curator. Its finances come predominantly from fundraisers and donations, and having nearly closed in 2016, after a downturn in corporate donations, notably from the oil and gas sector, it had recovered by 2019. Its operations are supported by, as of 2019, at least 170 volunteers.

It also hosts the Aberdeen Modellers Society (AMS) who meet on a regular basis at the museum.

== OBE for museum's Chief Executive ==
In the 2026 Birthday Honours, the Chief Executive of the museum John Fraser McLeish was appointed an Officer of the Order of the British Empire.

== Popular culture ==
The museum was selected as one of the named locations for the 2019 Aberdeen edition of the game Monopoly.
