= Botides =

Pot-smashing Christian custom on Corfu

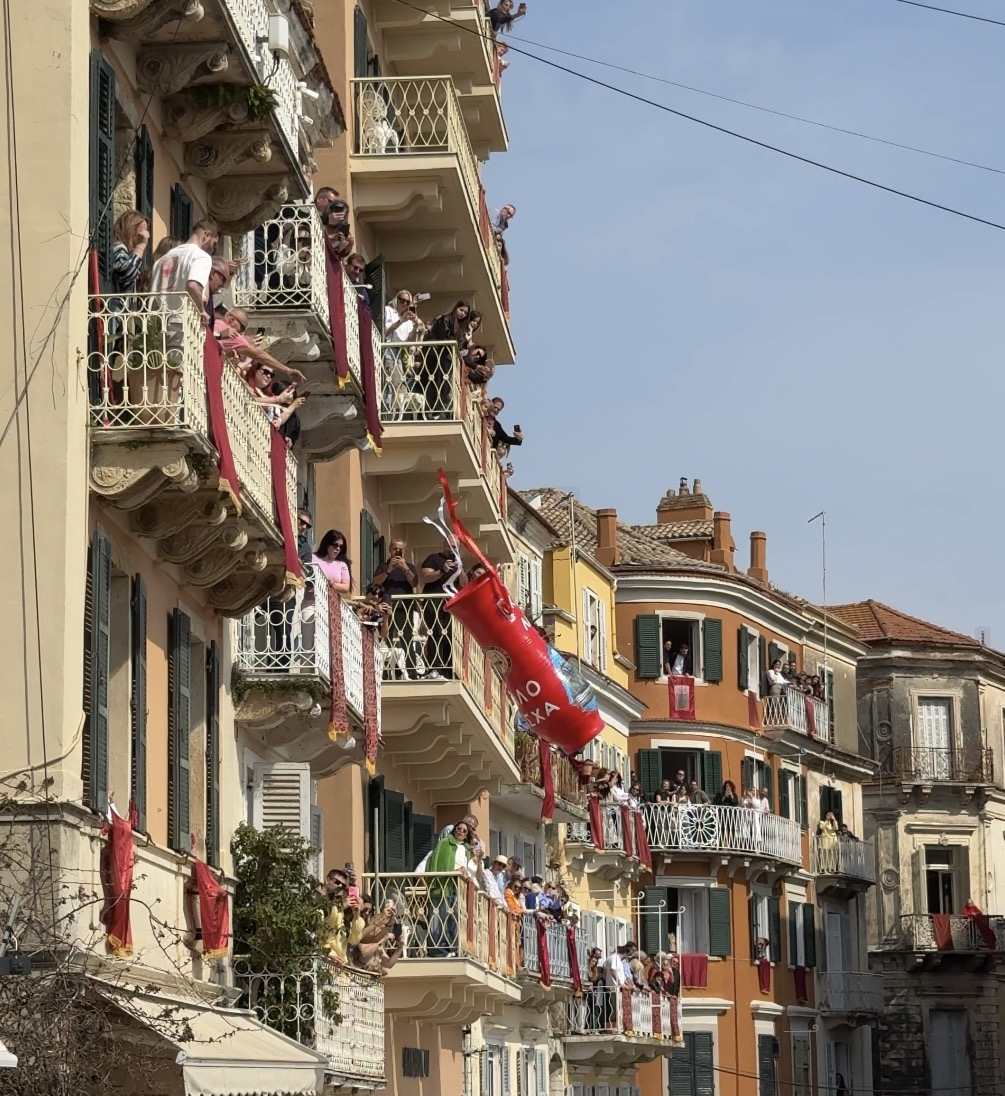
- Decorated windows with the Botides on the balconies
- Also called: Smashing of the Pots
- Observed by: Christianity, Corfu
- Liturgical color: Red
- Type: Local custom on Holy Saturday
- Significance: Easter
- Begins: 11:00
- Ends: 11:15
- Date: Holy Saturday, 11 April 2026
- Duration: 1 Day
- Frequency: Annual
- Related to: Easter in Corfu

The custom of smashing the botides (Greek: μπότηδες), or "Smashing of the Pots", constitutes a central and special Easter event in the City of Corfu, which takes place on Holy Saturday during the First Resurrection.

Pot smashing on Pentofanaro / Liston

At 11 in the morning, immediately after the completion of the procession of Saint Spyridon and the Epitaph, the Vespers of the Resurrection is held at the Holy Metropolitan Church. With the signal of the First Resurrection, the bells of all the churches in the city and the island ring joyfully. The start of the throwing is signaled the moment the Metropolitan chants the verse "Arise, O God, judge the earth, for you shall inherit all nations". At the same time, residents throw clay objects and pots filled with water, the botides, from the balconies of their houses and their windows onto the street, mainly in the area of the Liston and the Old Town.

The botides are clay pots (jugs), filled with water, with a narrow mouth and two handles on the side, tied with red ribbons. Their volume varies, with some reaching a significant size. The windows are decorated with a red cloth, a color considered the symbol of the island.

It is a custom celebrated only in Corfu and has roots from the Venetian years of the island's occupation. The oldest reference to the custom is found at least from the 19th century. The Venetians then, as Catholics, would smash old pots on New Year's Day as a "tribute" to the new year, in order to bring new goods to their households.

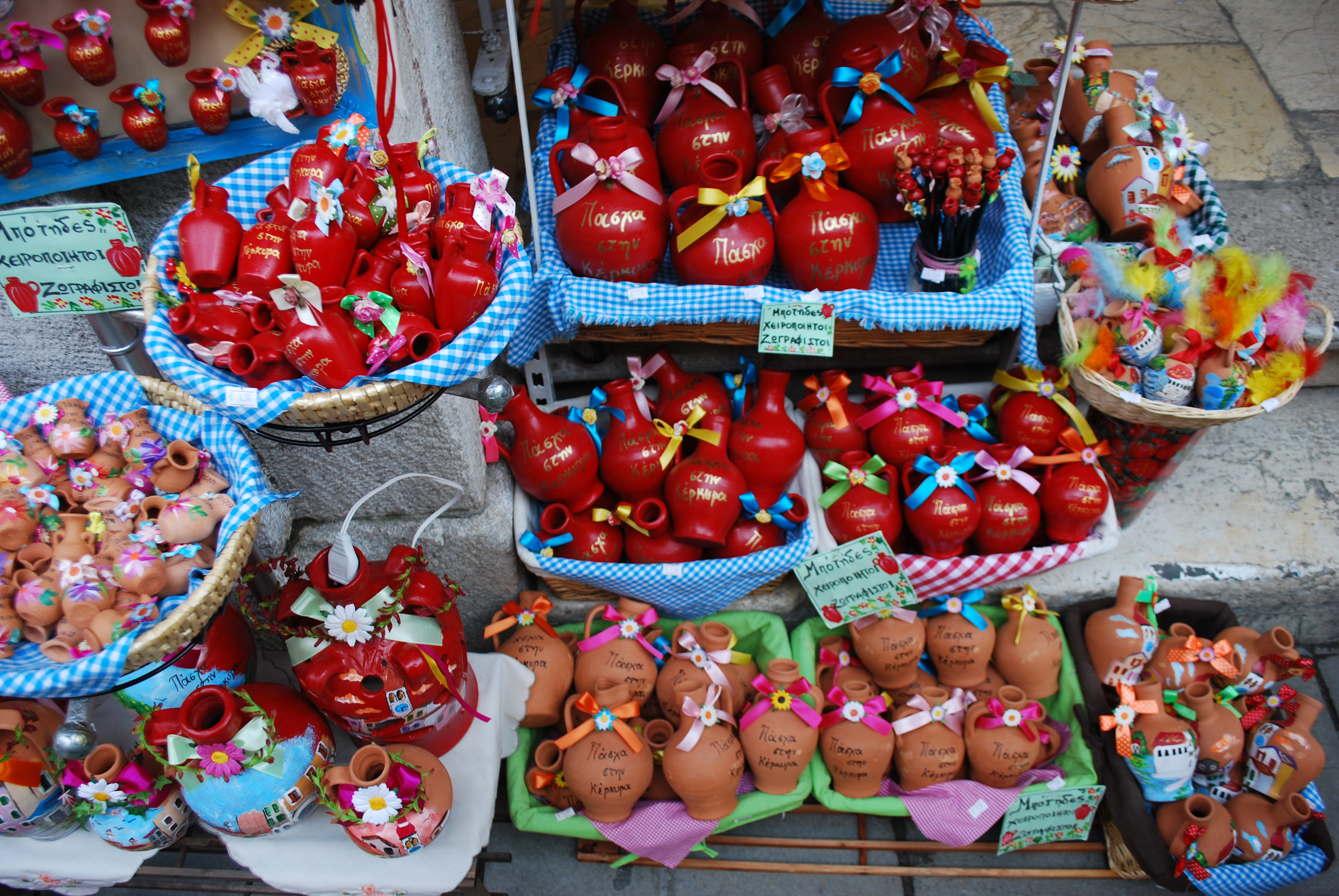
Corfiot botides

There is a version that the Orthodox Corfiots adopted the custom and chronologically moved it to Easter, the period when the Venetians allowed them to celebrate the Resurrection only at noon. Another interpretation connects the noise of the smashing with the representation of the earthquake that, according to the Gospel tradition, occurred at the moment of Christ's Resurrection. Perhaps the loud noise from the smashing symbolizes the victory of life over death. The Corfiots attribute Christian content to this local tradition, allegorically representing the Resurrection word of the prophet "so that I shall shatter them like a potter's vessel". A third theory attributes the custom to a remnant of ancient Greek ceremonies for fertility and the rebirth of nature in spring, during which they threw away old pots, so that the new ones would be filled with the new fruits. According to a medieval version, the smashing of the pots and their noise aims at the expulsion of evil spirits and bad luck, symbolizing the removal of misfortune and its replacement with the new year.

After the throwing, residents collect pieces of the clay fragments, which are considered to bring good luck and prosperity.

This custom is also accompanied by the local philharmonic bands. Immediately after the smashing of the pots is completed, the philharmonic bands (such as the Corfu Philharmonic Society or Palaia, the Philharmonic Society "Mantzaros" and the Philharmonic Union "Kapodistrias") take to the streets of the city again, playing joyful marches such as the allegro march "Oi Grekoi" or "Do not fear Greeks". At the same time, in the area of Pinia (Koukounara), which was the old commercial center of the city, the custom of the mastela is revived in recent years. According to this custom, a wooden barrel (the mastela), filled with water and decorated with myrtles and ribbons, is placed in the middle of the street. Passersby are invited to throw coins, making a wish. With the announcement of the first Resurrection (bell ringing), a citizen (now a volunteer, while previously the Piniatores were chosen, i.e., the porters of the area) jumps into the barrel to collect the coins, simultaneously receiving a splash. The event is organized by the Organization of Corfiot Events (O.K.E.).

== Gallery ==
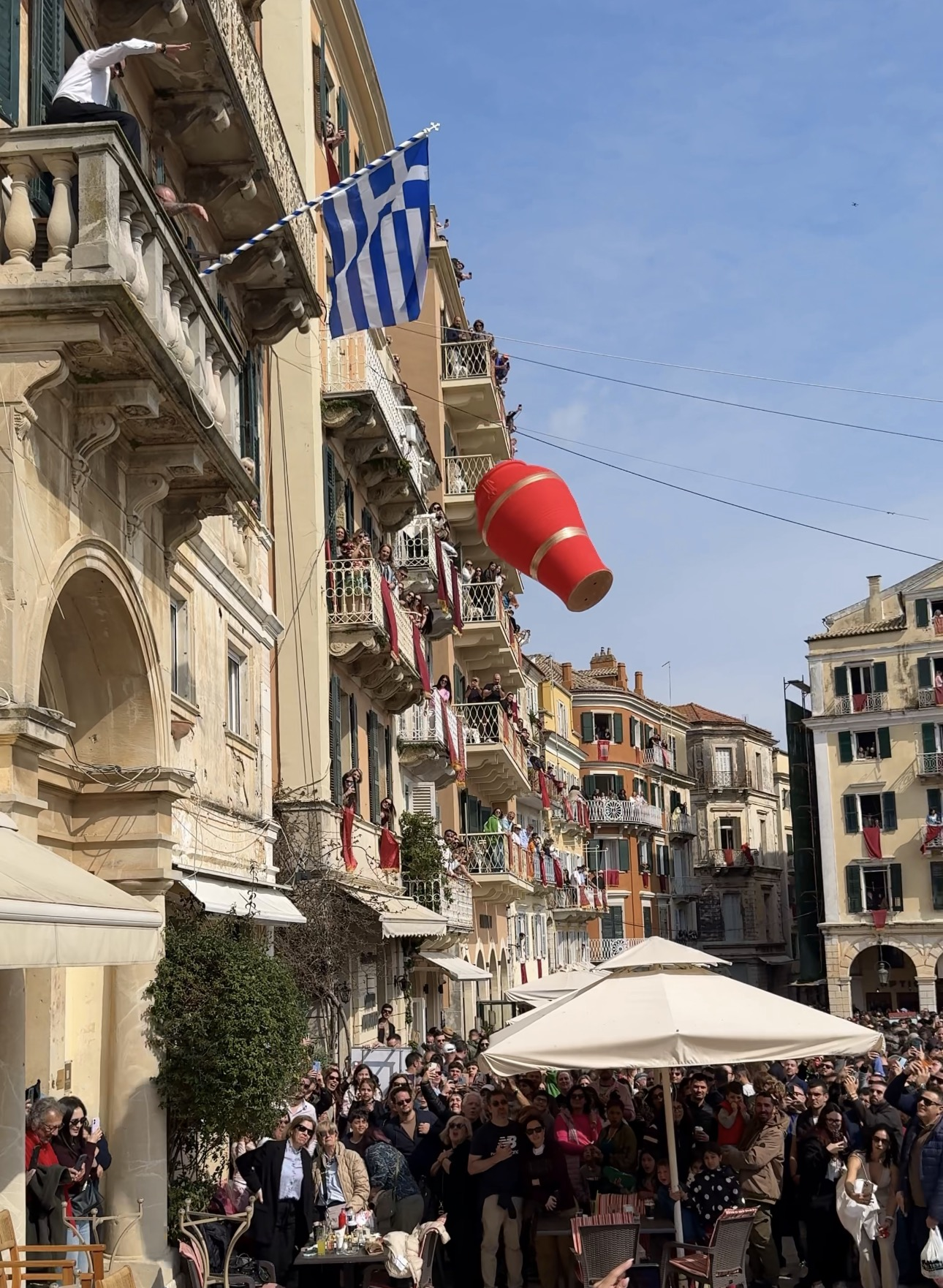

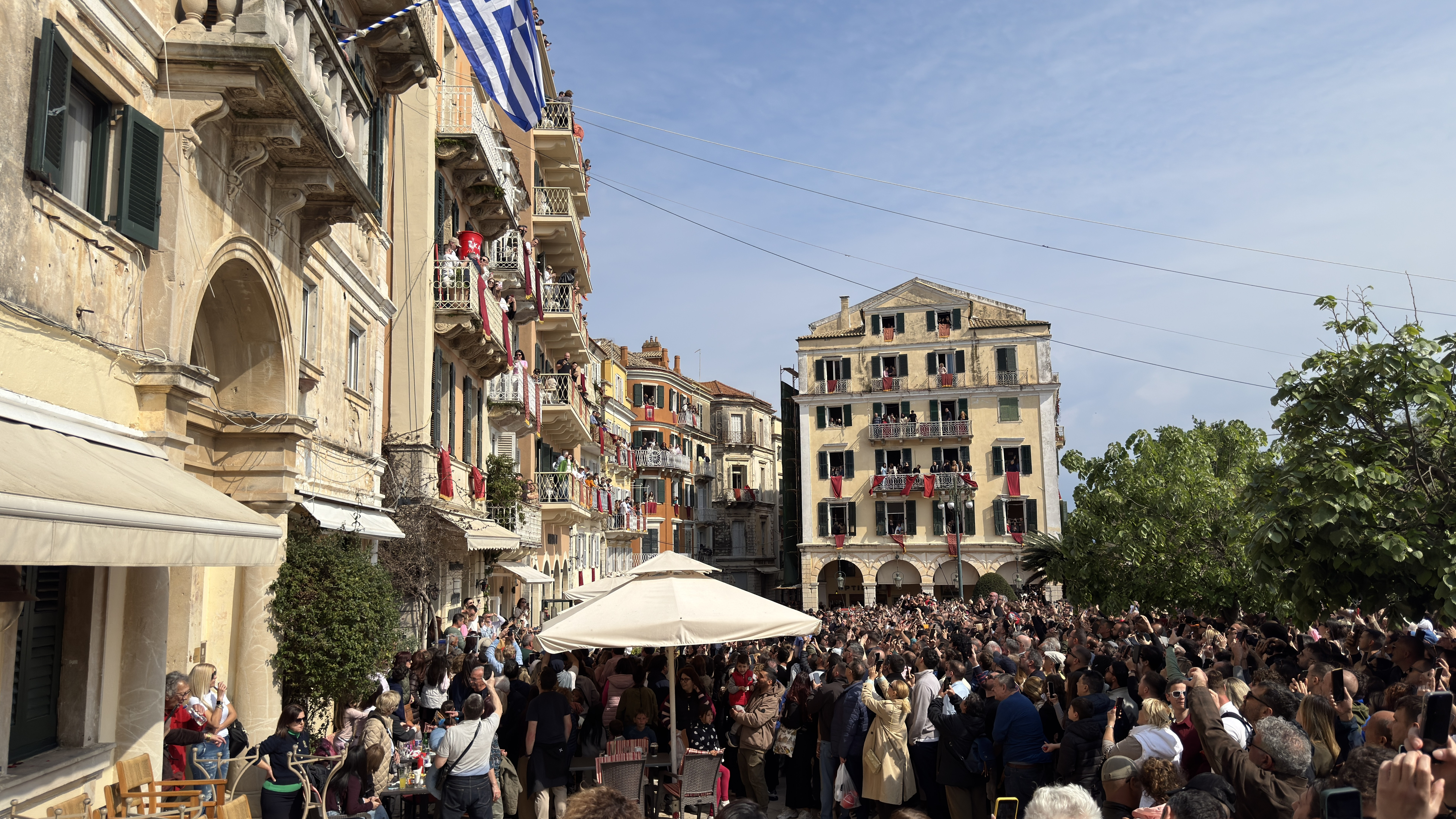

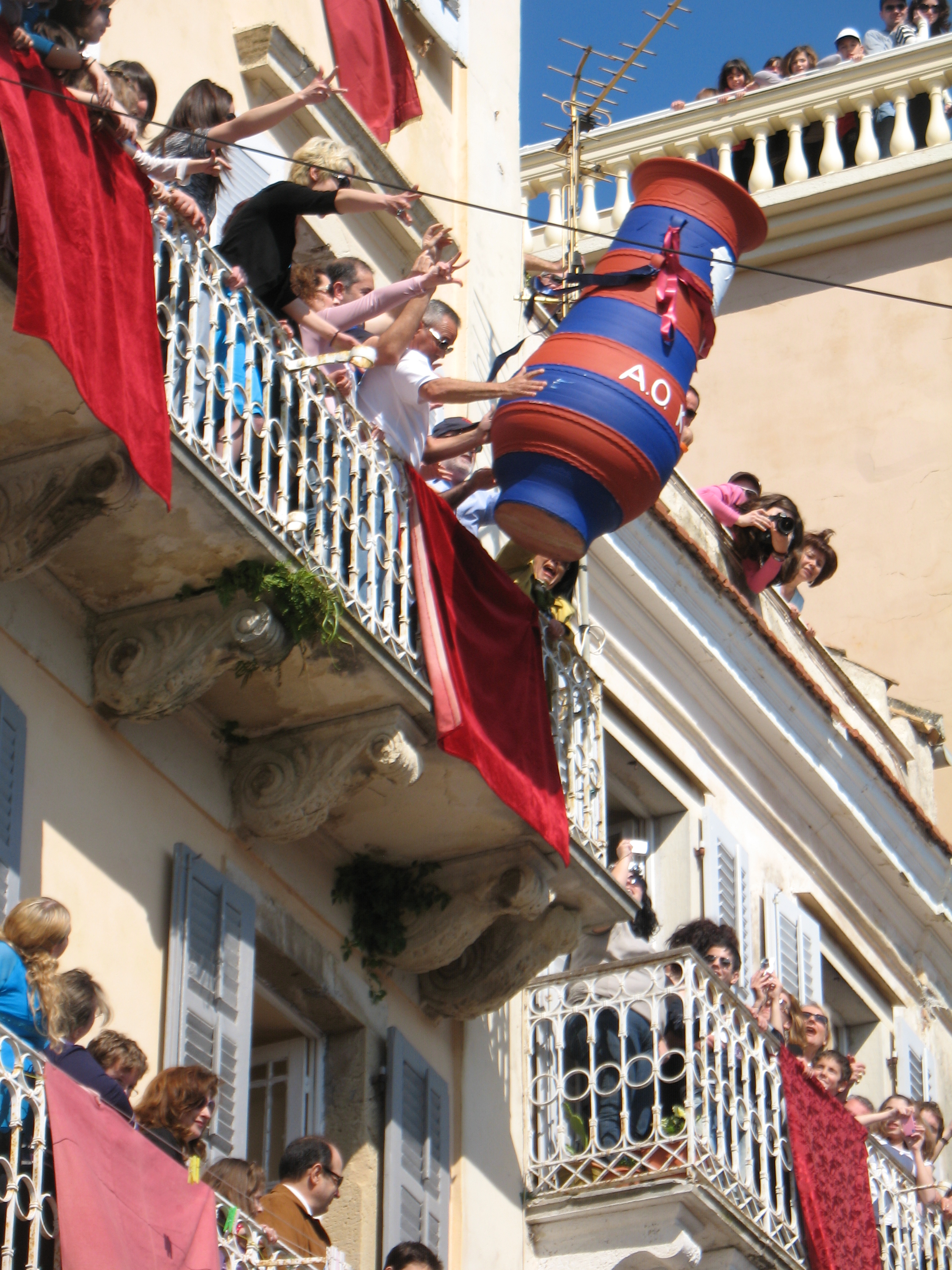
