= Celebration of the Union of the Ionian Islands =

- Official name: Anniversary of the Union of the Heptanese with Greece
- Also called: 21st of May
- Observed by: Ionian Islands, Greece
- Type: Regional Holiday
- Significance: Integration of the Ionian Islands into the Kingdom of Greece and end of British protection
- Celebrations: Official Doxology, Military Parade with Philharmonic Bands and students
- Date: May 21
- Frequency: Annual
- Related to: United States of the Ionian Islands, Treaty of London (1864)

The Celebration of the Union of the Ionian Islands is an established anniversary in the Ionian Islands commemorating the union of the United States of the Ionian Islands with the Kingdom of Greece on May 21, 1864. This day is an official public holiday for the Ionian Islands Region and includes various events centered in the city of Corfu.

== The Ceremony of May 21, 1864 ==
The Union was formally completed with the protocol of surrender and acceptance which took place at the Old Fortress and the Palace of St. Michael and St. George.

On the morning of May 21, 1864, the last British High Commissioner, Henry Storks, handed over authority to the special envoy of the Greek Government and representative of King George I, Thrasyvoulos Zaimis.

The ceremony included the following:

- Lowering of the British flag and the flag of the Ionian State.
- Raising of the Greek flag at the Old Fortress and a 21-gun salute.
- Departure of the British garrison and installation of the Greek army.

Subsequently, Thrasyvoulos Zaimis issued a proclamation, officially marking the integration of the islands into the Greek Kingdom.

== Modern Celebrations and Customs ==
The celebration takes place annually and has both an ecclesiastical and political character.

=== Corfu ===
In Corfu, which was the capital of the former Ionian State, the following take place:

- Doxology: Held at the Church of Saint Spyridon, officiated by the Metropolitan of Corfu.
- Parade: Schools, scouts, the military, and security forces parade. They are accompanied by the island's Philharmonic Bands, marching along Agoniston Polytechniou Avenue along the Spianada.
- Air Shows: Upon the conclusion of the parades, the program often features demonstrations and maneuvers by fighter jets over Garitsa Bay and the Old Fortress.
- Wreath Laying: Takes place at the Union Monument, as well as at monuments of figures associated with it (such as Ioannis Kapodistrias and Konstantinos Lomvardos).

=== Kefalonia and Zakynthos ===
In Kefalonia and Argostoli, a doxology is held, along with a memorial service at the Radicals' Monument and a student parade. The program often includes concerts by choirs.

In Zakynthos, the Municipality organizes memorial ceremonies, emphasizing the actions of the Radicals.

=== Athens ===
The anniversary is also celebrated in Athens by the Heptanesian Confederation and local associations. They usually hold a doxology at the Metropolitan Cathedral of Athens and a wreath-laying ceremony at the Tomb of the Unknown Soldier.

== The Treaty of London and the Union ==
The union of the Ionian Islands with the Kingdom of Greece was sealed with the Treaty of London (1864). The treaty was signed on March 29, 1864, by the Great Powers (United Kingdom, France, Russia, Prussia) and Greece, through its representative Charilaos Trikoupis, and came into effect on May 21, 1864, when British troops departed.

Britain's decision to cede the United States of the Ionian Islands is often cited as an example of voluntary decolonization and was based on the high cost of maintaining the islands, which no longer held such great strategic importance. At the same time, it was a gesture of support for the new King of Greece, George I.

The agreement stipulated that the islands would remain neutral (a condition that ultimately applied only to Corfu and Paxos), that the fortresses of Corfu would be demolished, and that the Greek State would assume certain financial obligations.

== See also ==
- United States of the Ionian Islands
- Treaty of London (1864)
