= Easter in Corfu =

Local version of the Christian observance

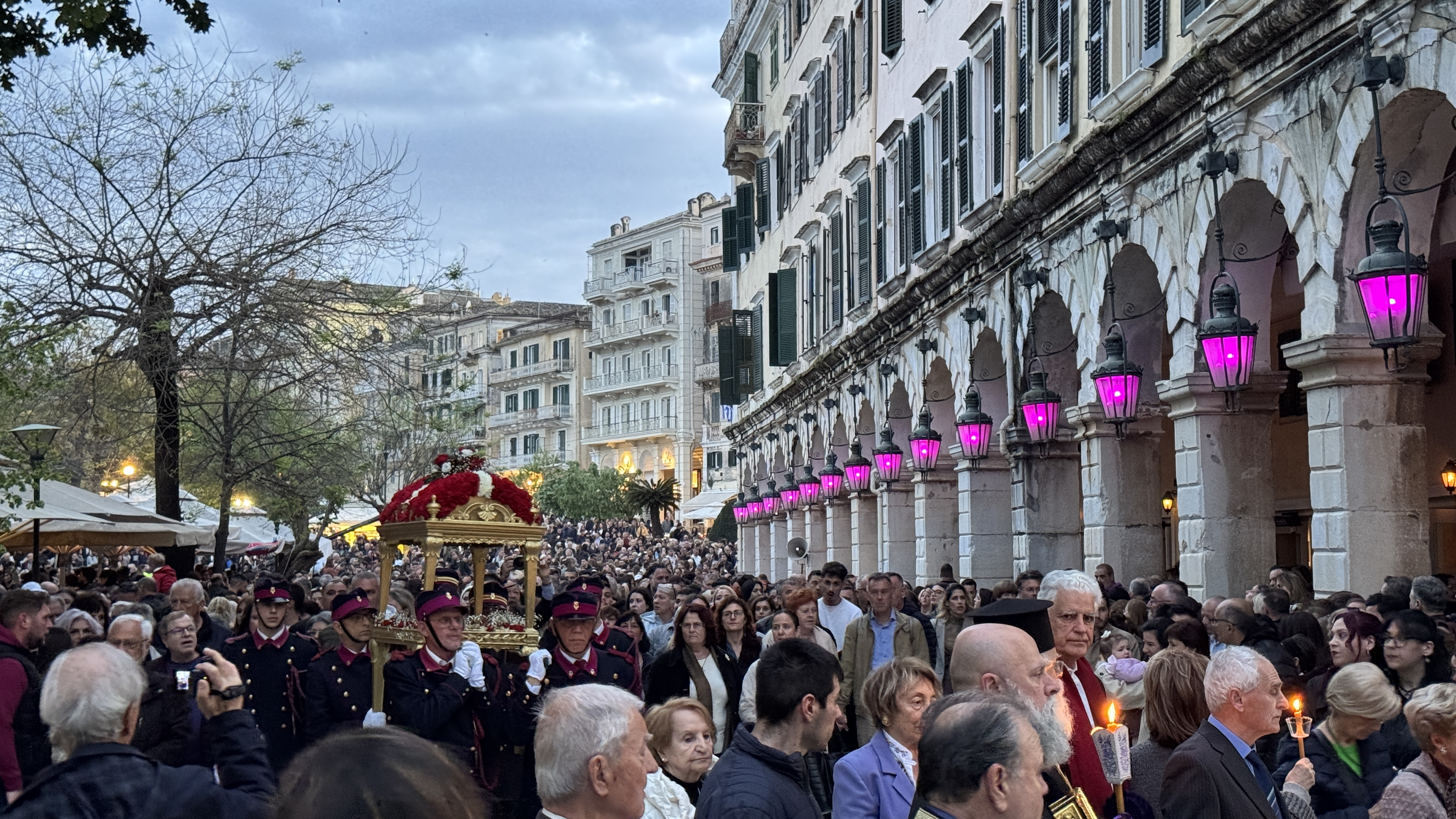
- View of the Liston Street on Holy Friday
- Also called: Corfiot Easter
- Observed by: Christians on Corfu
- Liturgical color: Red
- Type: Cultural
- Significance: Easter
- Celebrations: Litanies, Epitaphs, Pot smashing, Fireworks
- Begins: Lazarus Saturday, 4 April 2026
- Ends: Easter Sunday, 12 April 2026
- Duration: ≈ 1 Week
- Frequency: Annual
- Related to: Botides, Easter

Easter in Corfu is a unique blend of Catholic and Orthodox Christian religious traditions, influenced by Venetian customs and local cultural elements. Since the period of Venetian rule, Easter has been jointly celebrated by both the Orthodox and Catholic Churches.

The most significant days, rich in traditions and customs, are Holy Friday and Holy Saturday, during which the most characteristic ceremonies of Holy Week take place.

== Holy Friday ==
On Holy Friday, starting at 2:00 PM, the procession of Epitaphs begins in the cantons and squares of the city and lasts until 10 in the evening, when the procession of the Epitaph of the Μetropolitan Church will begin. There are 33 epitaphs, symbolizing the 33 years of Christ's life.

Each Epitaph is accompanied by a choir, philharmonic, large candles "tortses", towering banners and flambura "scoles". They are also accompanied by schools, scouts and the Red Cross.

The Epitaph of the Metropolis is accompanied by the clergy and the local authorities, all the philharmonic bands of Corfu, playing solemn funeral marches (such as Albinoni's Adagio, Abel Moreno Gomez's La Madruga, Verdi's Marcia Funebre, Mariani's Sventura and Chopin's Marche Funèbre) alongside choirs.

Epitaph Schedule
Time	Church
12:30	St. Irene (General Hospital); St. Artemios (Police Department, Old Hospital)
14:00	Pantokrator (Kampiello); Holy Virgin Spilaiotissa (New Fortress)
15:30	St. Nicholas of the Baths (St. Nicholas Gate)
16:00	St. George (Old Fortress)
16:30	St. Panteleimon (Psychiatric Hospital)
17:00	Monastery of St. Euphemia (Mon Repos); Holy Virgin Odigitria (Porta Remounda)
17:30	Monastery of Holy Virgin Kassopitra (Figareto); Ascension (Analipsi); St. George (Mandouki)
18:00	All Saints (City); Resurrection (1st Municipal Cemetery); Monastery of St. Theodore (Stratia)
18:30	St. Paraskevi (Porta Remounda)
19:00	St. Anthony (Spilia); Holy Trinity (Garitsa); St. Constantine & Helen (Koulines); Dormition of Holy Virgin Mamaloi (Kogevina Hill); Sts. Jason and Sosipatros (Garitsa)
19:15	St. Sophia (Jewish Quarter); Holy Virgin of Vlachernae (Garitsa)
19:30	St. Eleftherios (Kofineta); St. Spyridon Sarokos (Kotsela); Three Holy Martyrs (Garitsa); Holy Virgin Faneromeni / Panagia ton Xenon (Plakada)
20:00	St. Basil (Pinia); St. John of Lazos (Kefalomandouko); St. Barbaros (Potamos); St. Nicholas of Alykes (Alykes); All Saints (Gouvia)
20:15	St. Nicholas of the Elders (Kampiello)
20:30	St. John (Piazza)
20:45	Sts. James & Christopher (Catholic Cathedral / Duomo)
21:00	St. Spyridon (Inside the Church); Holy Trinity (Kontokali)
22:15	Holy Virgin Spilaiotissa, Metropolitan Cathedral (Spilia)

"The Mother's Pain" by the Philharmonic Society of Corfu on Holy Friday

"La Madruga" by the Mantzaros Philharmonic Society on Holy Friday

Kapodistrias Philharmonic Union on Holy Friday

"Adagio" by the Philharmonic Society of Corfu on Holy Friday

== Holy Saturday ==
=== The "Earthquake" ===
Early in the morning of Holy Saturday, at 06:00 a.m., at the Church of Panagia ton Xenon, the custom of the earthquake is reenacted. It is caused by noise and the shaking of all the icons and vigil lamps of the church. The faithful beat the pews to cause an artificial earthquake and represent the earthquake that followed the Resurrection of Jesus.

=== Procession of Saint Spyridon ===
At 9:00 a.m. from the Church of Saint Spyridon starts the procession of the Saint, which was established in 1550 when Corfu was saved from famine. Simultaneously, the Epitaph is also carried in procession, in contrast to the rest of Greece, where epitaphs are taken out on Good Friday. It is a custom maintained since 1574. The Venetians, for security reasons, prohibited Orthodox processions on Good Friday, allowing only the procession of the Saint on Holy Saturday. Since then, Corfiots carry the Epitaph of Saint Spyridon's church together with the Saint's relics. The procession is followed by the three major philharmonic bands of Corfu, performing solemn marches such as adaptations from the opera Amleto by Franco Faccio, Calde Lacrime by Cesare de Michelis, "The Kingdom of Pluto" by D. Andronis, and the Eroica Symphony by Beethoven.

=== The breaking of the "Botides" (First Resurrection) ===
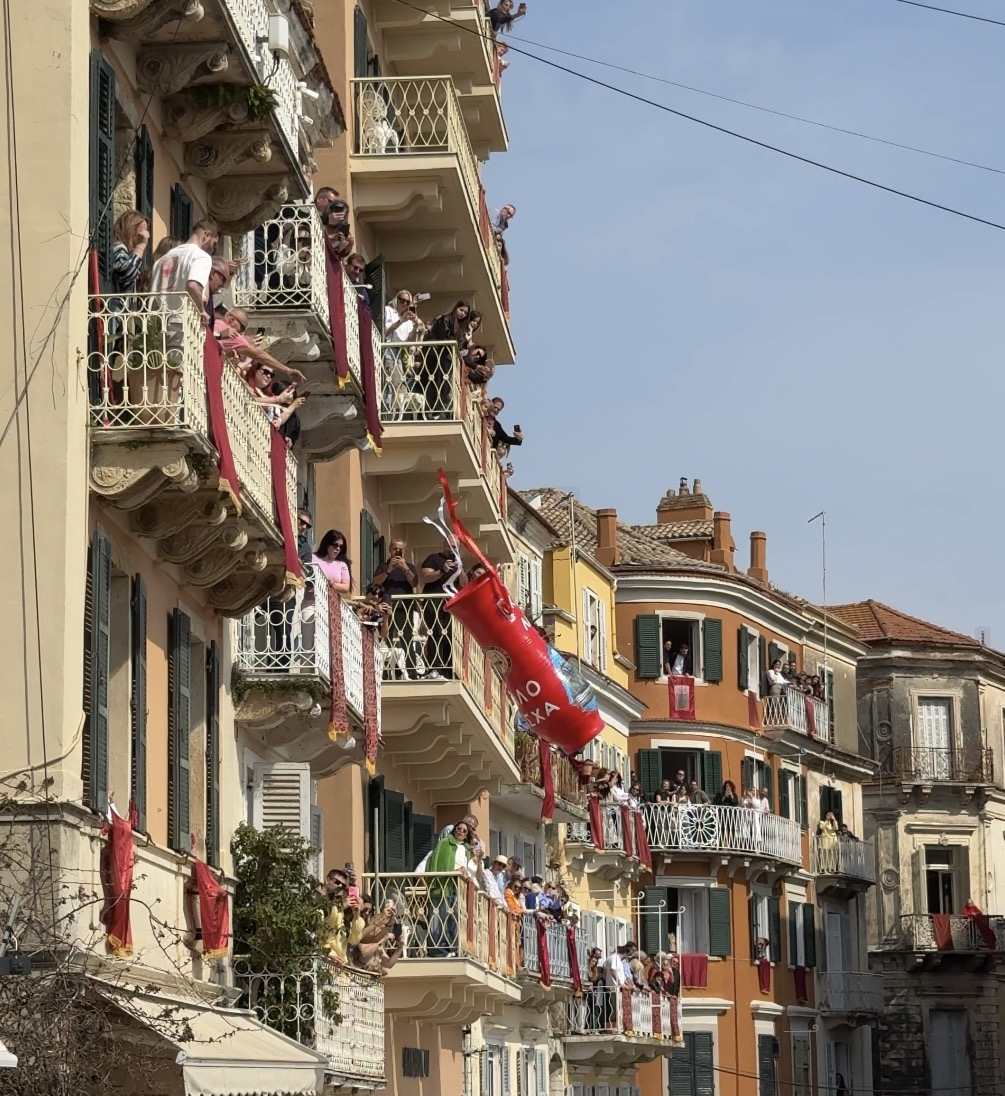
Botides in Pentofanaro Sq.

At 11:00 a.m., with the signal of the First Resurrection, the church bells ring joyfully across the city, and residents throw the botides out of their windows or balconies. The botides are clay jugs, filled with water, with a narrow neck and two handles on the side, tied with red ribbons. The windows are adorned with a red cloth. The breaking of the jugs symbolizes the removal of bad luck, which is why to this day locals and visitors take the pieces home.

It is a custom celebrated only in Corfu and has roots from the Venetian era. The Catholic Venetians broke old jugs on New Year's Day as a "tribute" to the new year, to bring them new goods to their homes. The Orthodox Corfiots adopted the custom and moved it to Easter, when the Venetians allowed them to celebrate only at midday.

"Grekoi" by the Philharmonic Society of Corfu on Holy Saturday

This custom is also accompanied by the local philharmonics. As soon as the pots are smashed, the philharmonic bands take to the streets once again, playing the joyful march “Grekoi”.

==== The "Mastela" custom ====
Fireworks at 00:00 on Easter Sunday in Spianada Sq.

The "Mastela" custom takes place in the Pinia area. According to the custom, residents place a barrel filled with water and decorated with flowers and ribbons and invite passersby to throw coins while making a wish. At the time of the First Resurrection, someone jumps in and collects the coins. Centuries ago when the custom started, residents would catch an unsuspecting passerby walking in the city and throw him into the barrel to collect the coins.

==== The tradition of the Holy Light ====
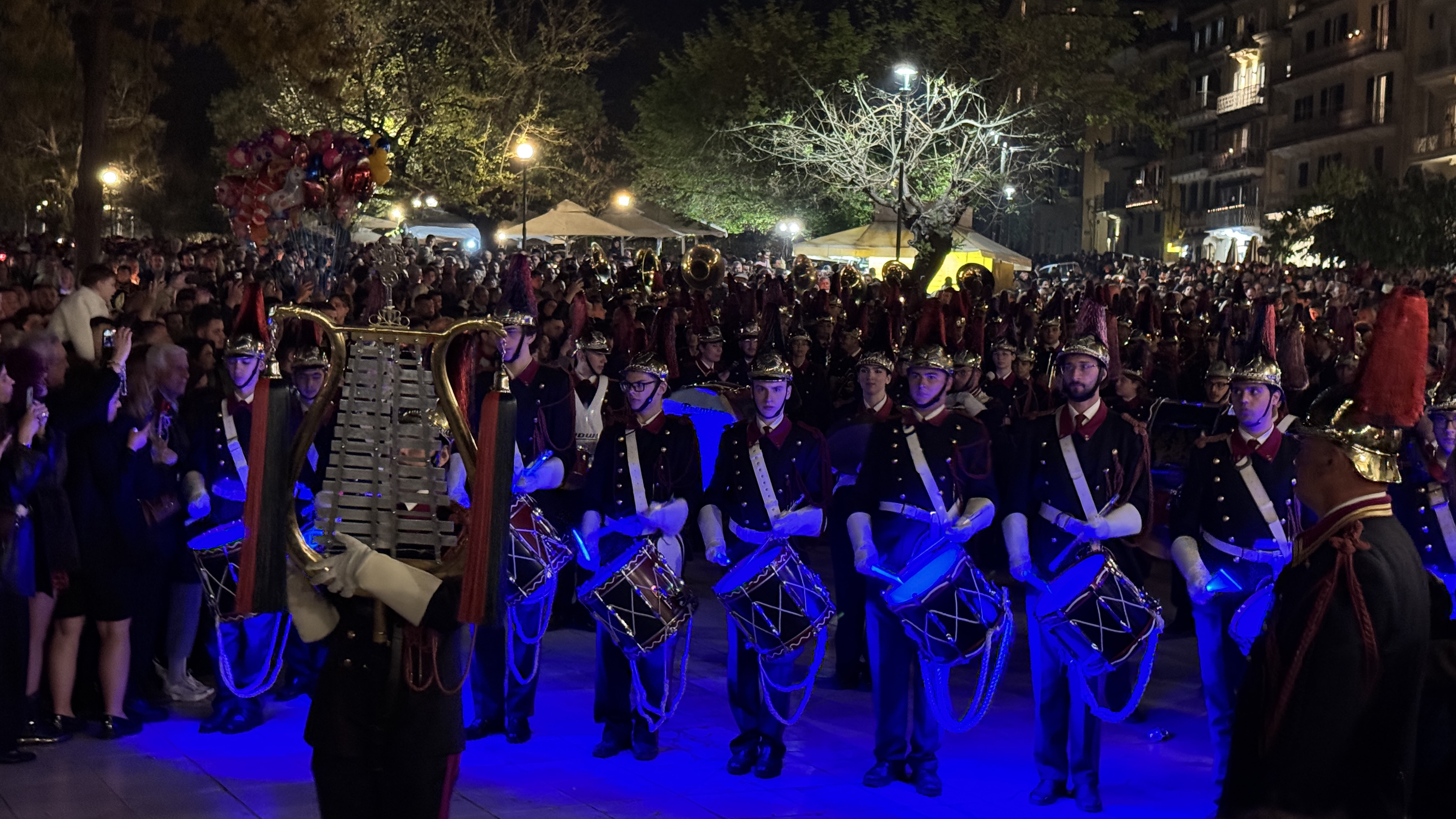
The Philharmonic Society of Corfu after the Resurrection

The reception of the Holy Light takes place in Pentofanaro in the presence of local authorities and is transferred to the Church of Saint Paraskevi where the Resurrection Service begins. Shortly before midnight, the Resurrection procession is moved to the music pavilion of the Upper Spianada Square. There the Resurrection is celebrated and "Christos Anesti" is chanted, with the three Philharmonic bands of the city playing the march "Grekoi". This is followed by drumming, flares, and fireworks.

== Holy Week ==
=== Lazarus Saturday ===
Customs related to Easter start on Lazarus Saturday. Every year on the eve of Saturday after sunset in the village of Episkepsi in northern Corfu, the local choir and crowds of people sing the "carols of Lazarus" in the neighborhoods, while housewives offer Lenten snacks and wine.

On the day, after the service held in the Church of "Saint Nicholas of the Elders" (San Nicolo dei Vecchi) in the "Kambielo", at 11:30 in the morning, choral ensembles of the island start a musical tour in various parts of the historic center of the city, singing the "Carols of Lazarus". Their final meeting takes place in "San Giaccomo", the old Town Hall of the City. This event is organized by "Carrier of Corfiot Expression". In the afternoon, a religious music concert is traditionally held at the Municipal Theater of Corfu.

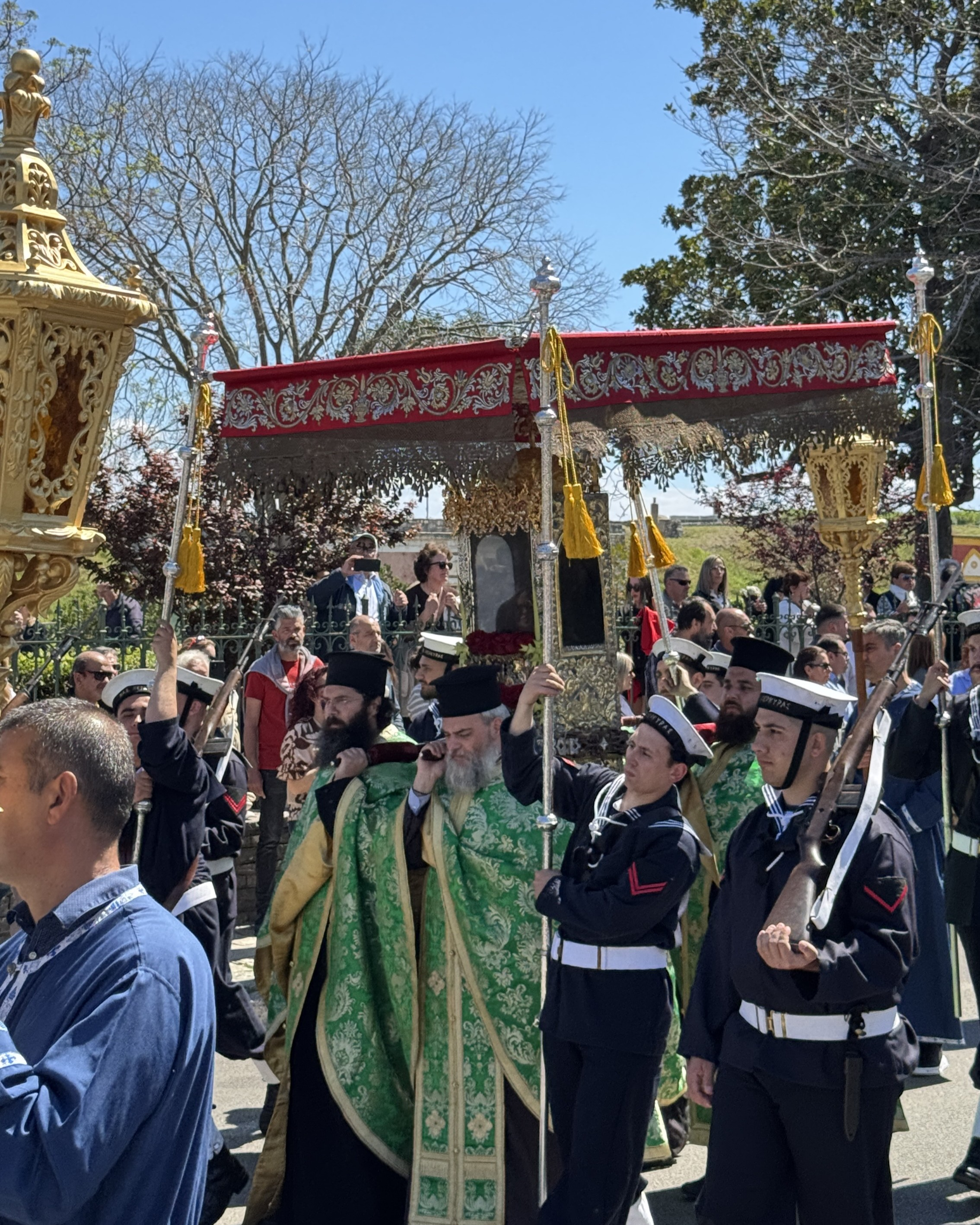
Procession of Saint Spyridon's Relic on Palm Sunday

=== Palm Sunday ===
On Palm Sunday, which in Corfu is called "Kyriaki ton Vagione", a procession of Saint Spyridon's relic is held every year at 11:00 a.m. in memory of the liberation of the island from the plague epidemic in 1629. According to the Christian religious tradition, following the miraculous intervention of Saint Spyridon, the island was saved from the deadly pestilence.

This is the longest procession of the Saint. All 17 Philharmonic Orchestras of Corfu participate, and after the procession, they parade in the Old Town playing happy marches.

=== Holy Monday ===
On Holy Monday, Corfiot housewives begin baking traditional sweet breads: "fogatses" (of Venetian origin with liqueur and kumquat) and "colombines" (braid-shaped, decorated with a red egg and a feather). In the evening, the "Mantzaros" Philharmonic usually holds a concert at the Municipal Theatre of Corfu featuring works inspired by the Holy Passion.

=== Holy Tuesday ===
On Holy Tuesday, the "Troparion of Kassiani" is chanted in churches and outdoors by island choirs. In the evening, a Musical Poetry Night is organized at the Peristyle of the Old Palace.

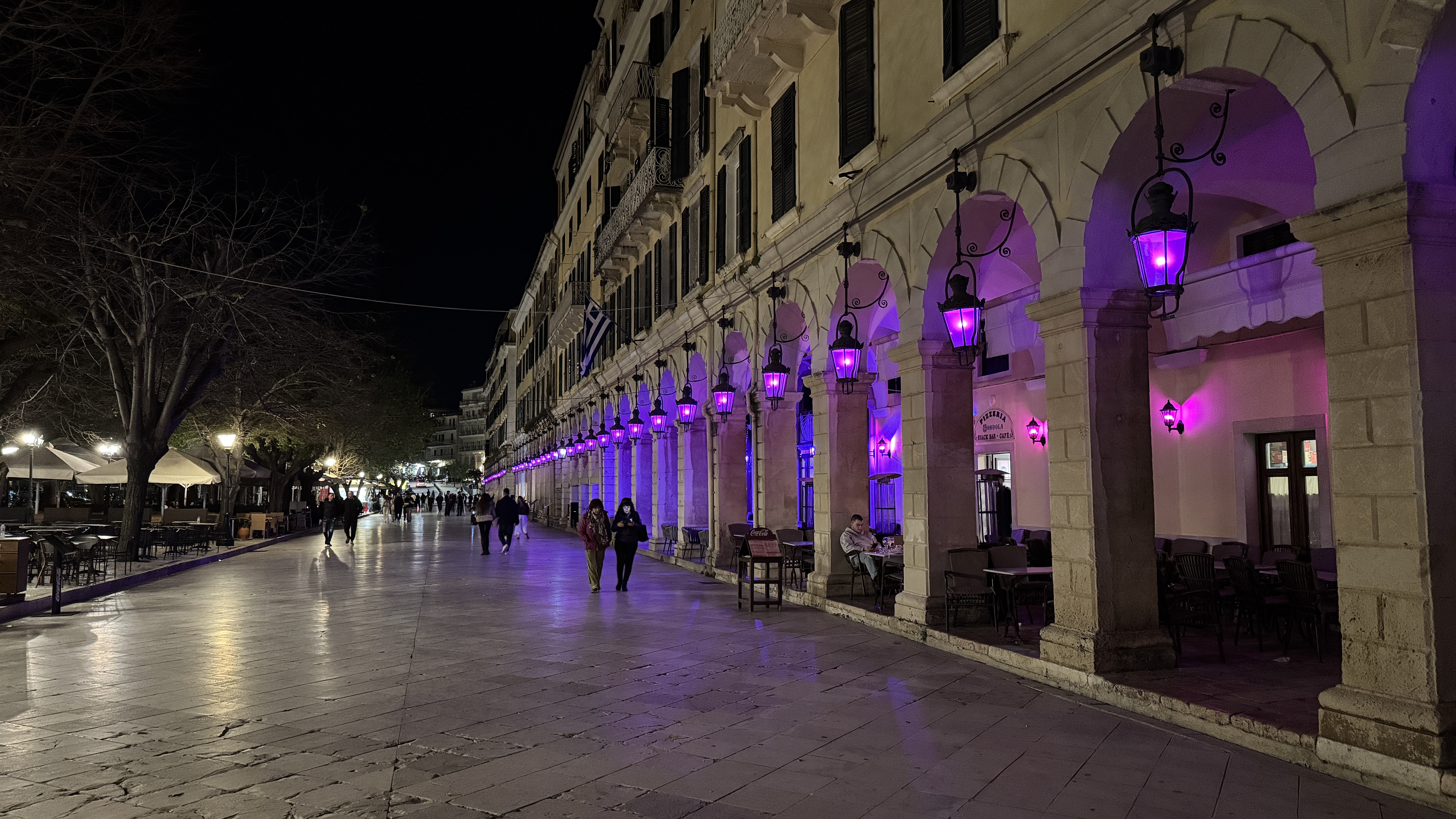
Purple lights in Liston

=== Holy Wednesday ===
On Holy Wednesday the lanterns in the streets of the city, in Liston and the Palace are lit up in purple, as is the cross in the Old Fortess of the city. Earlier in the afternoon, the Service of the Washing of the Feet is chanted by the Choir of Ecclesiastical Music.

=== Holy Thursday ===
On Holy Thursday, in the Catholic Cathedral (Duomo), there is a reenactment of the washing of the Apostles’ feet by Jesus. The Catholic Archbishop symbolically washes the feet of 12 children. In villages, the custom of "weaving the maypole" revives inside the church. In the evening, large crowds gather around the buildings of the three philharmonic bands to listen to funeral marches during their final general rehearsal.

=== Easter Sunday ===
On the morning of Easter Sunday, the Resurrection Divine Liturgy and the procession of the Lord's Resurrection icon take place in many churches, following the old Byzantine tradition. In the afternoon, the Vespers of Love is held at the Metropolitan Cathedral, during which the Gospel is read in multiple languages.

=== Easter Tuesday ===
On Tuesday afternoon (18:00), the placing of the Holy Relic of Saint Spyridon back in its reliquary takes place. This custom is known as "Mpasmatha of the Saint", held in the presence of local authorities and the participation of the city's oldest philharmonic bands.

== Philharmonic Marches ==
- Before the 1st Resurrection

Philharmonic Band	Holy Friday	Holy Saturday
Corfu Philharmonic Society (Old)	Withered Leaves - Gerasimos Kanioros	Marcia Funebre (Amleto) - Franco Faccio
Corfu Philharmonic Society (Old)	Light of the Cross - Antonis Soueref & Georgios Ninos	Marcia Funebre (Amleto) - Franco Faccio
Corfu Philharmonic Society (Old)	The Mother's Pain - Dimitrios Kafyris	Marcia Funebre (Amleto) - Franco Faccio
Corfu Philharmonic Society (Old)	Adagio in G minor - Tomaso Albinoni (trans. G. Belli)	Marcia Funebre (Amleto) - Franco Faccio
Corfu Philharmonic Society (Old)	Descent into Hades - Spyros Prosoparis	Marcia Funebre (Amleto) - Franco Faccio
"Mantzaros" Philharmonic Society	Aranjuez - (trans. Vikentios Gionanidis)	Calde Lacrime - Cesare de Michelis
"Mantzaros" Philharmonic Society	La Madruga - Abel Moreno Gomez	Calde Lacrime - Cesare de Michelis
"Mantzaros" Philharmonic Society	Quattro Pezzi Sacri - Giuseppe Verdi	Marcia Funebre - Dimitrios Andronis
"Mantzaros" Philharmonic Society	Marcia Funebre - Stefanos Dolianitis	Marcia Funebre - Dimitrios Andronis
"Kapodistrias" Philharmonic Union	Sventura - Giuseppe Mariani	Symphony No. 3 (Eroica), 2nd Movement - Ludwig van Beethoven
"Kapodistrias" Philharmonic Union	Destiny - Michalis Michalopoulos	Symphony No. 3 (Eroica), 2nd Movement - Ludwig van Beethoven
"Kapodistrias" Philharmonic Union	Marcia Funebre - Frédéric Chopin	Symphony No. 3 (Eroica), 2nd Movement - Ludwig van Beethoven

- After the 1st Resurrection

== Gallery ==
View of the Liston buildings with the traditional red cloth on Holy Saturday

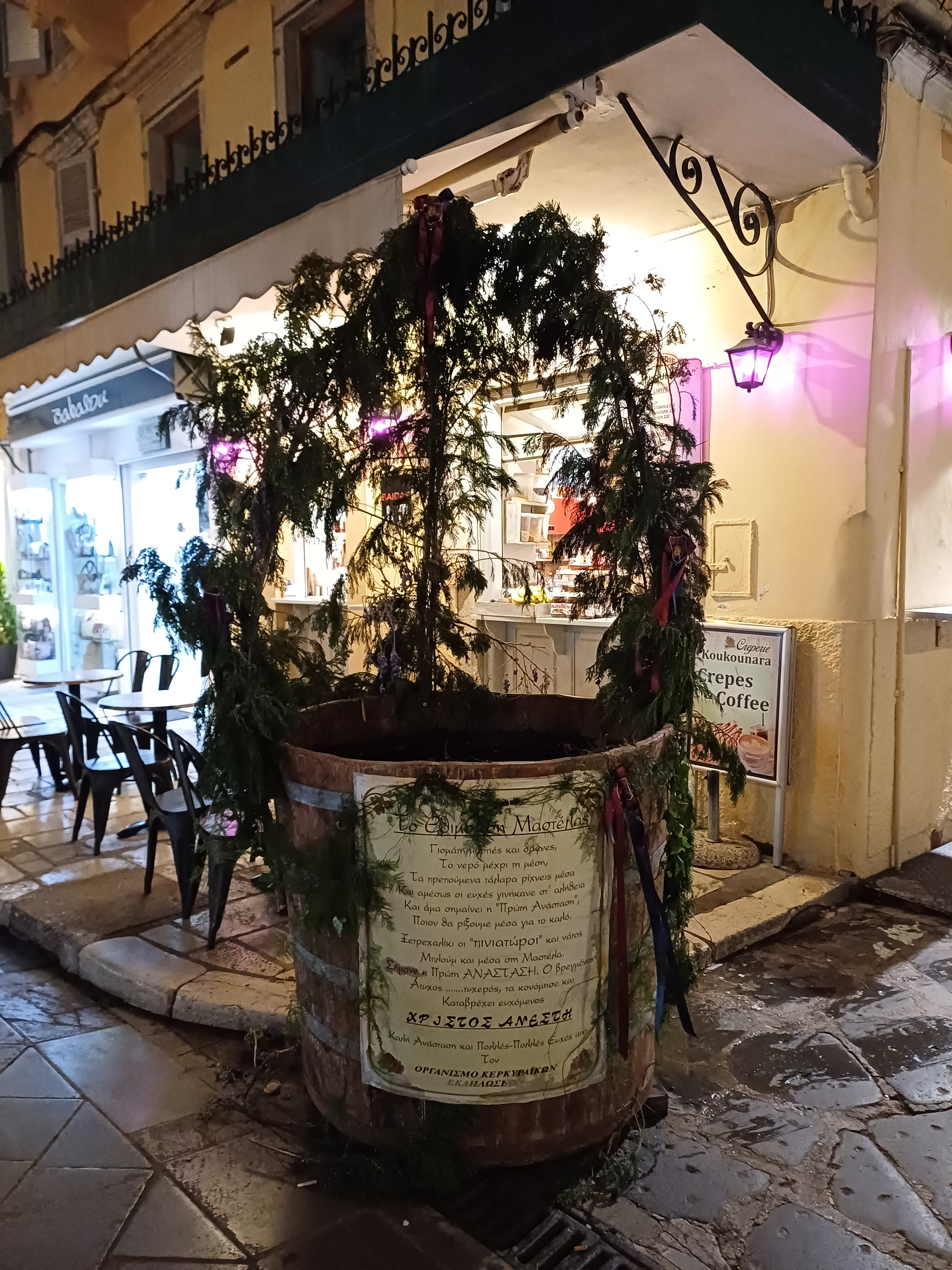
The “Mastela” custom barrel

"The Mother's Pain" by the Philharmonic Society of Corfu on Holy Friday in Liston

Botides on Pentofanaro / Liston

Botides on Pentofanaro / Liston

Botides on Pentofanaro / Liston

== See also ==
- Saint Spyridon
- Saint Spyridon Church
- Corfu City
- Corfu Island
