= St. Spyridon Choir =

St. Spyridon Choir Χορωδία «Άγιος Σπυρίδων»
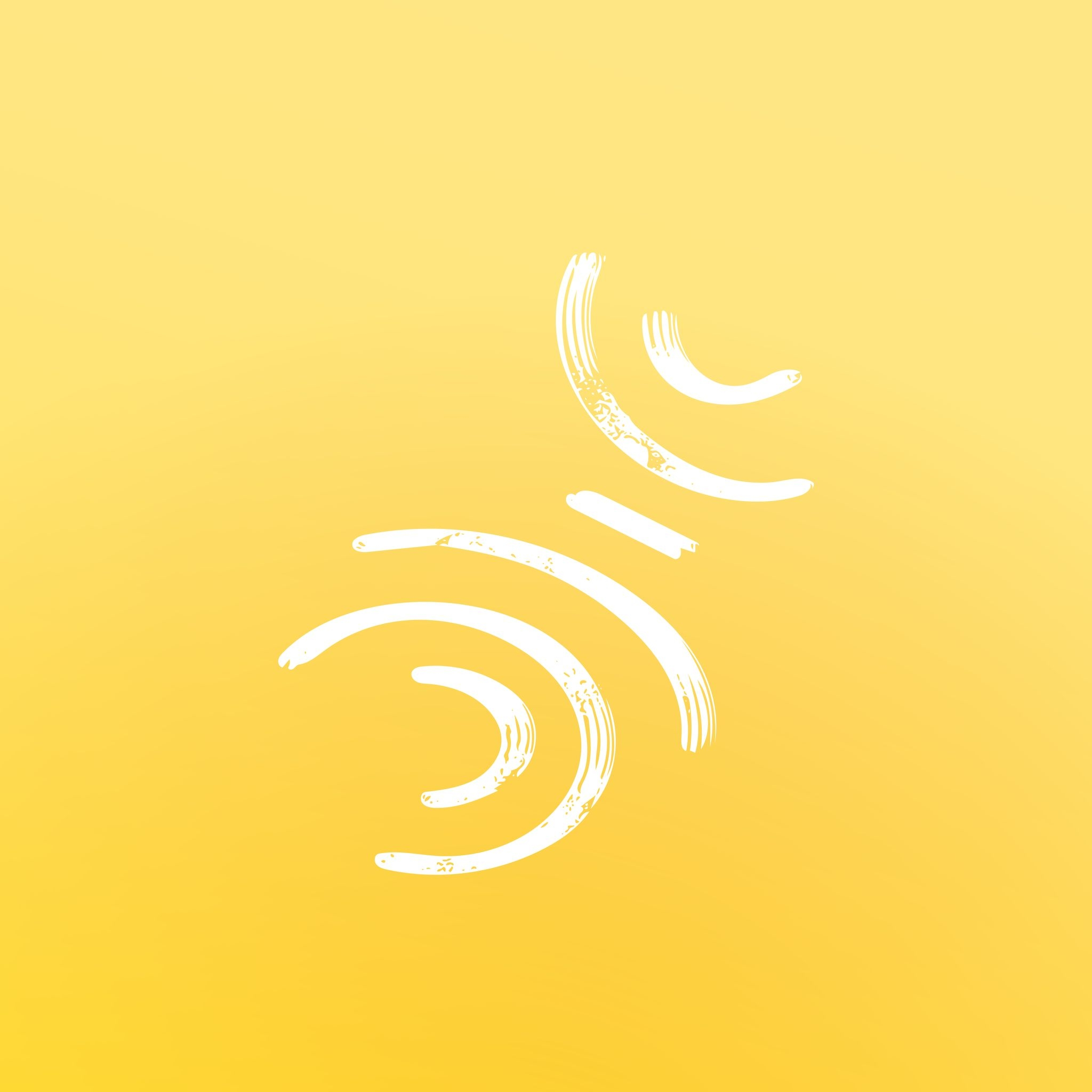
- The official logo of the choir

Background information
- Origin: Corfu, Greece
- Genre: Choral music
- Years active: 2023–present
- Awards: 1st Position & Gold Award (World Choir Games 2026); Gold Award (14th World Peace Choral Festival 2025)
- Members: Children's & Youth Choir; Women's Choir
- Website: Facebook
- Founder & Conductor: Christina Kalliaridou
- Affiliation: Ionian University (Dept. of Music Studies)
- Colors: Gold, White
- Facebook Instagram YouTube TikTok LinkedIn

St. Spyridon Choir (Greek: Χορωδία Άγιος Σπυρίδων, romanized: Khorodía Ágios Spyrídon) is a cultural association based in Corfu, Greece, specializing in choral music. It consists of a Children's-Youth Choir and a Women's Choir.

== History ==
The association was founded in September 2023 in Corfu with the aim of promoting music education and choral art on the island. It operates in direct collaboration with the Department of Music Studies of the Ionian University, serving as a laboratory ensemble for the specialization in "Conducting Children's, School, and Youth Choirs." Within this framework, university students participate as members and assistant instructors. The president of the association is Eustathios Makris, Associate Professor and Vice-Rector of the Ionian University.

== Direction and repertoire ==
The artistic director and conductor of the choir is Christina Kalliaridou. The repertoire includes classical, traditional, and contemporary works. In addition to the works of Mikis Theodorakis, such as the Liturgy of St. John Chrysostom, the choir performs pieces by classical composers such as Anton Bruckner (Locus Iste) and Wolfgang Amadeus Mozart (Divertimenti), as well as contemporary works like the suite The Durrells by Derek Lawrence. Furthermore, it participates in liturgical events during Easter in Corfu and Christmas, performing Byzantine and Corfiot ecclesiastical music.

== Awards ==
In August 2026, the choir, conducted by Christina Kalliaridou, won 1st place in the Mixed Youth Choirs category at the World Choir Games held in Helsingborg, Sweden. The choir achieved a score of 23.16 points, was awarded the Golden Diploma – Level III, and was named Winner of the Open Competition (CW), while also securing qualification for Interkultur's major events for the next five years.

Additionally, the choir has received international recognition, winning the Gold Award in the category of four-part mixed youth choirs at the 14th World Peace Choral Festival, held in Vienna in July 2025. During the festival, the choir performed at the United Nations headquarters, St. Peter's Church (Peterskirche), and the MuTh theater of the Vienna Boys' Choir.
