= Liston (Corfu) =

Pedestrian street and district in Corfu, Greece

- Eleutherias Avenue
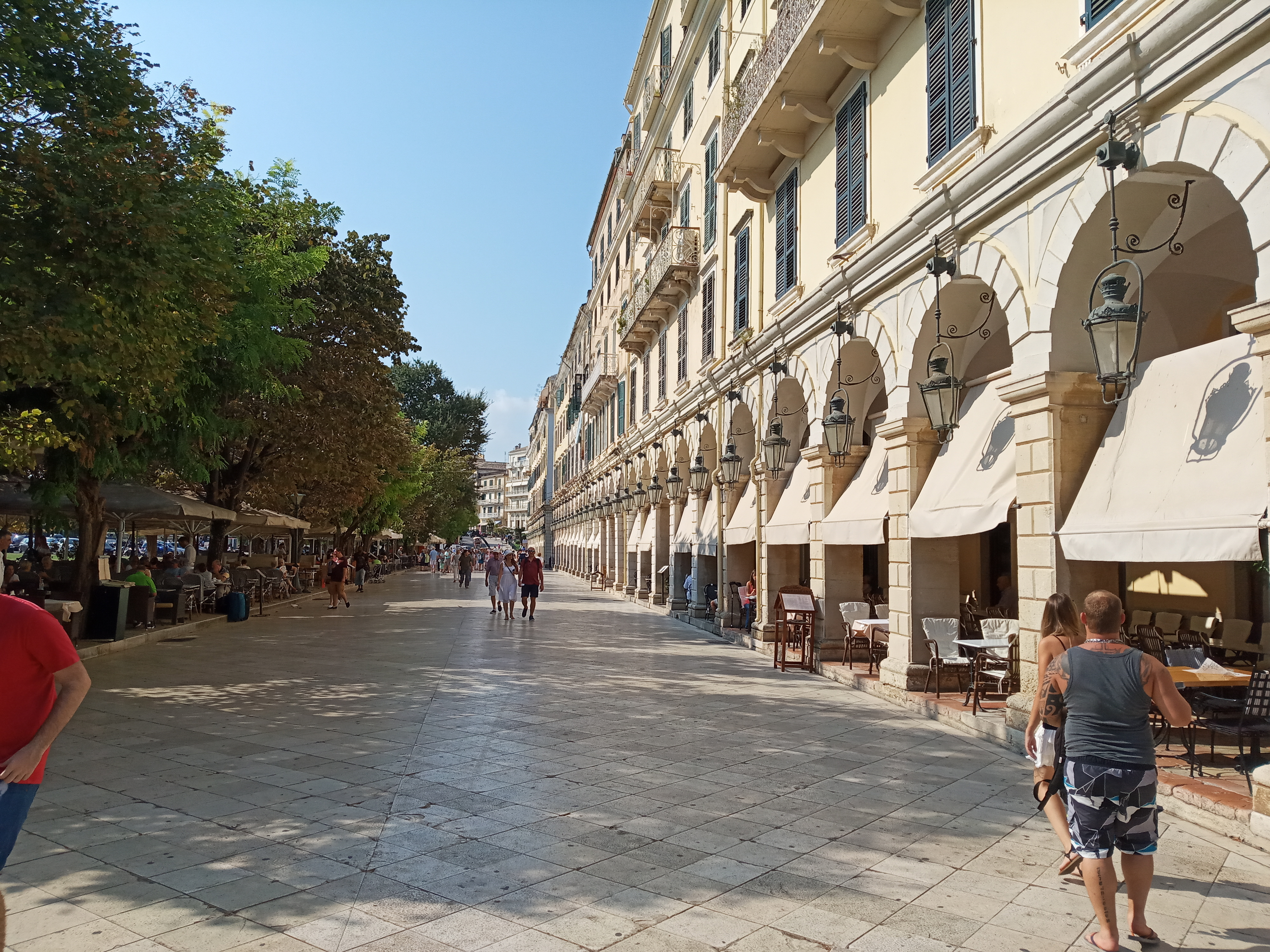
- Interactive map of Liston
- Type: Pedestrian Street
- Length: 150 m
- Coordinates: 39°37′27″N 19°55′25″E
- From: Pentofanaro
- To: Kofineta

Construction
- Completion: 1807

Other
- Designer: Mathieu de Lesseps

Liston (Greek: Λιστόν) is a pedestrian street and district in the western edge of Spianada in the city of Corfu in Greece.

It is one of the most popular sites in the city. Its name comes from the Venetian liston.

It was constructed during the French rule in the Ionian Islands (1807–1814) in 1807 by the French imperial commissioner Mathieu de Lesseps. It is an excellent example of architecture from the Napoleonic period, when Corfu was part of the First French Empire. The design was inspired by the Rue de Rivoli, Paris.

Brewster Chamberlin celebrated it in his 2005 poem "Along the Liston, Corfu", describing the Liston as a crowded, relaxed place to sit and snack and watch the promenaders.

The Liston runs along one side of the Spianada, part town square and part park. At one time it was a firing range for Venetian troops.

== Customs ==
Various customs take place along the pedestrian street, the most famous being the breaking of the “Botides” on Holy Saturday. At 11 a.m., with the signal of the First Resurrection, residents throw clay pots filled with water from their balconies, symbolizing the removal of misfortune. The custom is accompanied by the music of the city’s philharmonic bands.

== Residents ==
- Dionysios Solomos
