= Philharmonics of Corfu =

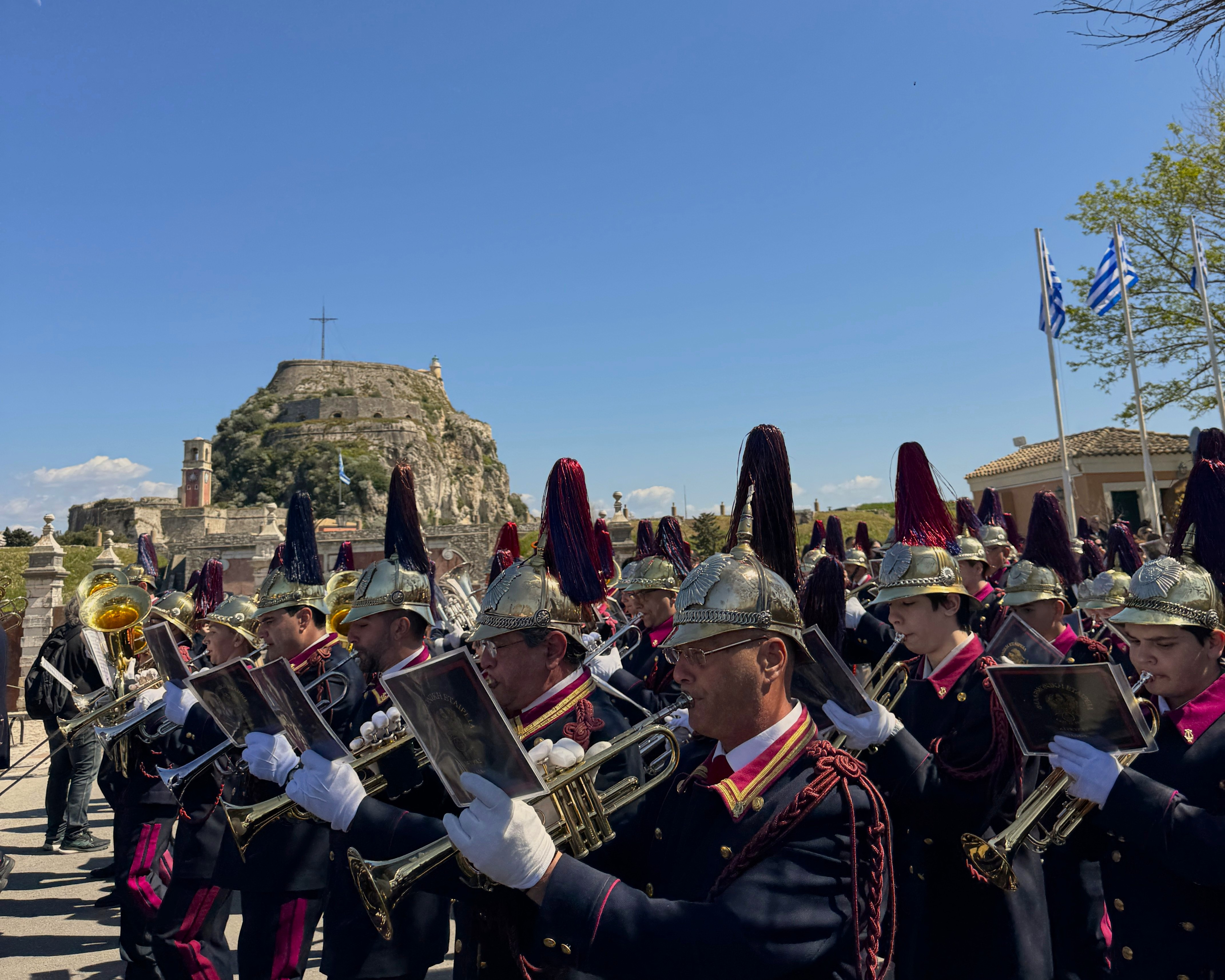
Corfu Philharmonic Society

The Philharmonic Societies of Corfu constitute a significant part of the island's cultural heritage, with a history starting in the 19th century.

These are musical ensembles of wind and percussion instruments that participate in religious and national holidays, as well as in public and cultural events.

The philharmonic societies also function as centers of music education, offering schools and departments for teaching instruments, choir, and music theory. Today, the philharmonic societies of Corfu continue to play an active role in the social and artistic life of the island, preserving the musical tradition and contributing to the cultural education of young people.

== Philharmonic Societies in the City of Corfu (3) ==
Name	Headquarters	Uniform Color	Uniform Details	Establishment	Other Information
Corfu Philharmonic Society ("Palaia")	City of Corfu	Dark Blue	Maroon	September 12, 1840	Oldest philharmonic in Greece. Founded as a center for music education with Mantzaros' vision for a "Music Academy." Approximately 350 people participate, 150 in the Parade Department.
Mantzaros Philharmonic Society	City of Corfu	Dark Blue	Cyan, White	November 18, 1890	Second historic philharmonic of the city. Maintains an active music body of approximately 300 people, 120 of whom are in the Parade Department.
Kapodistrias Philharmonic Union	City of Corfu	Red	Black, White	1980	The newest of the three major philharmonic societies. First appearance on New Year's Day 1980 (45 musicians). 25 teachers teach voluntarily and 250 students attend, 100 in the Parade Department.

== Philharmonic Societies in the Corfu Countryside (14) ==
Name	Location (village)	Uniform Color	Uniform Details	Establishment	Other Information
Gastouri Philharmonic "I Omonoia"	Gastouri	Dark Blue	Red	March 10, 1898	
Kinopiastes Philharmonic	Kinopiastes	Dark Blue	Maroon	1966	
Kontokali Philharmonic Society	Kontokali	Dark Blue	Maroon	1997	Started as a children's choir and band. Maintains approximately 40 students.
Skripero Philharmonic Association	Skripero	Dark Blue	Green	May 3, 1909	Evolution of a choir. First appearance March 25, 1911.
Lefkimmeans Brotherhood Philharmonic	Lefkimmi	Dark Blue	Orange	May 25, 1910	Founded by the Lefkimmeans Musical Artistic Union. Dissolved in 1915 due to the Balkan Wars and re-established in 1961.
Lefkimmi Philharmonic Society	Lefkimmi	Dark Blue	Green	1911	
Ano Korakiana Philharmonic "Spyros Samaras"	Ano Korakiana	Dark Blue	Yellow	1958	Award from the Academy of Athens (2000). Maintains schools for theory, rhythmic-melodic solfège, and instruments.
Municipal Philharmonic of Thinalia	Acharavi	Red	Yellow, Black	—	Over 100 students. Has a music archive of 100+ works.
Lakones Philharmonic Union "Saint Nicholas"	Lakones	Dark Blue	Maroon	1992	45 musicians and 90 members.
Karousades Philharmonic	Karousades	Dark Blue	Maroon, Yellow	—	Approximately 100 musicians and members.
Avliotes Philharmonic	Avliotes	Dark Blue	Maroon	—	70 members.
Liapades Philharmonic	Liapades	Dark Blue	Light Green	—	
Sinarades Philharmonic	Sinarades	Dark Blue	Yellow, Green	April 1, 1962	
Agios Mattheos Philharmonic Society "Lorenzos Mavilis"	Agios Mattheos	Dark Blue	Maroon	—	

== Most Famous Pieces ==
=== Easter ===
- Before the 1st Resurrection

Philharmonic Band	Holy Friday	Holy Saturday
Corfu P.S. (Old)	Withered Leaves - Gerasimos Kanioros	Marcia Funebre (Amleto) - Franco Faccio
Corfu P.S. (Old)	Light of the Cross - Antonis Soueref and Georgios Ninos	Marcia Funebre (Amleto) - Franco Faccio
Corfu P.S. (Old)	The Mother's Pain - Dimitrios Kafyris	Marcia Funebre (Amleto) - Franco Faccio
Corfu P.S. (Old)	Adagio in G minor - Tomaso Albinoni (trans. G. Belli)	Marcia Funebre (Amleto) - Franco Faccio
Corfu P.S. (Old)	Descent into Hades - Spyros Prosoparis	Marcia Funebre (Amleto) - Franco Faccio
"Mantzaros" P.S.	Aranjuez - (trans. Vikentios Gionanidis)	Calde Lacrime - Cesare de Michelis
"Mantzaros" P.S.	La Madruga - Abel Moreno Gomez	Calde Lacrime - Cesare de Michelis
"Mantzaros" P.S.	Quattro Pezzi Sacri - Giuseppe Verdi	Marcia Funebre - Dimitrios Andronis
"Mantzaros" P.S.	Marcia Funebre - Stefanos Dolianitis	Marcia Funebre - Dimitrios Andronis
"Kapodistrias" P.U.	Sventura - Giuseppe Mariani	Symphony No. 3 (Eroica), 2nd Movement - Ludwig van Beethoven
"Kapodistrias" P.U.	Destiny - Michalis Michalopoulos	Symphony No. 3 (Eroica), 2nd Movement - Ludwig van Beethoven
"Kapodistrias" P.U.	Marcia Funebre - Frédéric Chopin	Symphony No. 3 (Eroica), 2nd Movement - Ludwig van Beethoven

- After the 1st Resurrection
