= Spianada =

Square in Corfu, Greece

- Esplanade
- Σπιανάδα
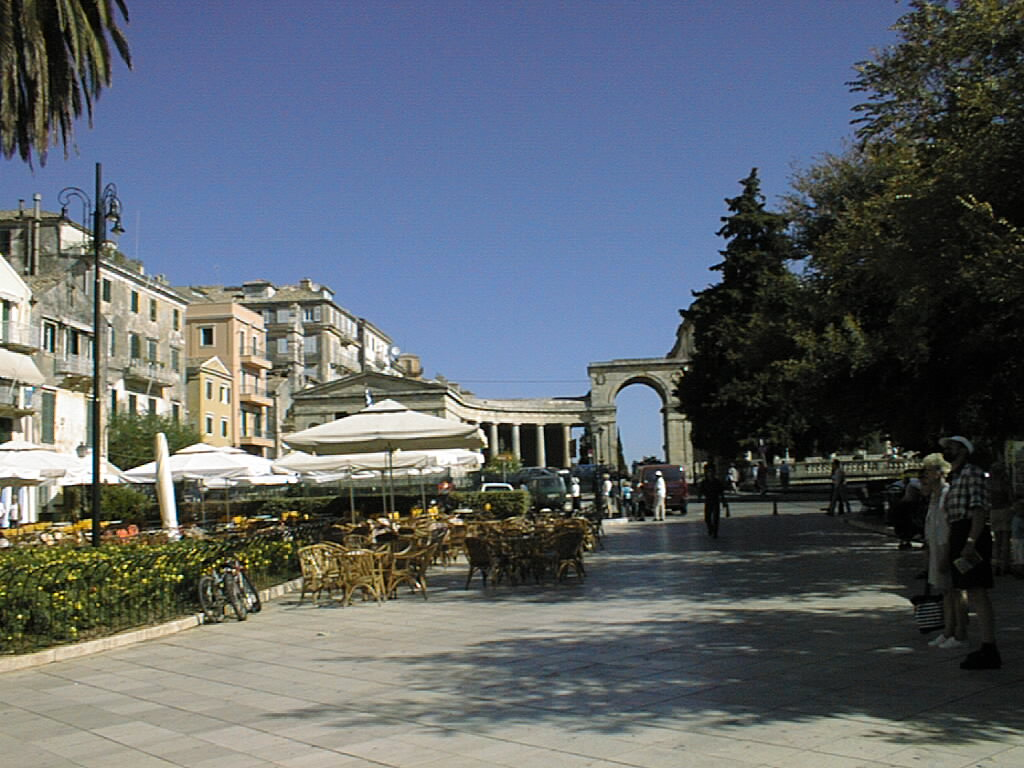
- Interactive map of Spianada
- Type: Public square, Urban park
- Location: Corfu, Greece
- Coordinates: 39°37′24″N 19°55′28″E
- Administrator: Municipality of Corfu
- Water: Fountain (Vagianos well)
- Parking: Yes
- Monuments: Maitland Rotunda, Monument of the Union of the Eptanese
- Facilities: Playground, cricket field
- Other information: Services: Toilets

Spianada (Greek: Σπιανάδα, pronounced [spi.aˈna.ða], "esplanade") is a large central square located in the city of Corfu, Greece. It is the largest square in Greece, the biggest in Europe and the 27th biggest in world by area and is situated directly in front of the Old Fortress.

== Upper Square (Leonida Vlachou Square) ==
The Upper Square (Pano Plateia) forms the southern part of the Spianada. It is an elongated area characterized by dense vegetation, flower beds, and landscaped walkways. At its center stands the circular Maitland Rotunda (locally known as "Rotunda") and the musical bandstand (Palko), where events and concerts by the local philharmonic societies take place.

== Lower Square (Enoseos Square) ==
The Lower Square (Kato Plateia) occupies the northern part of the area and extends parallel to the Liston complex. It is an open, flat, grass-covered space that hosts the city's Cricket field. The Palace of St. Michael and St. George dominates the northern end of the square.

== History ==
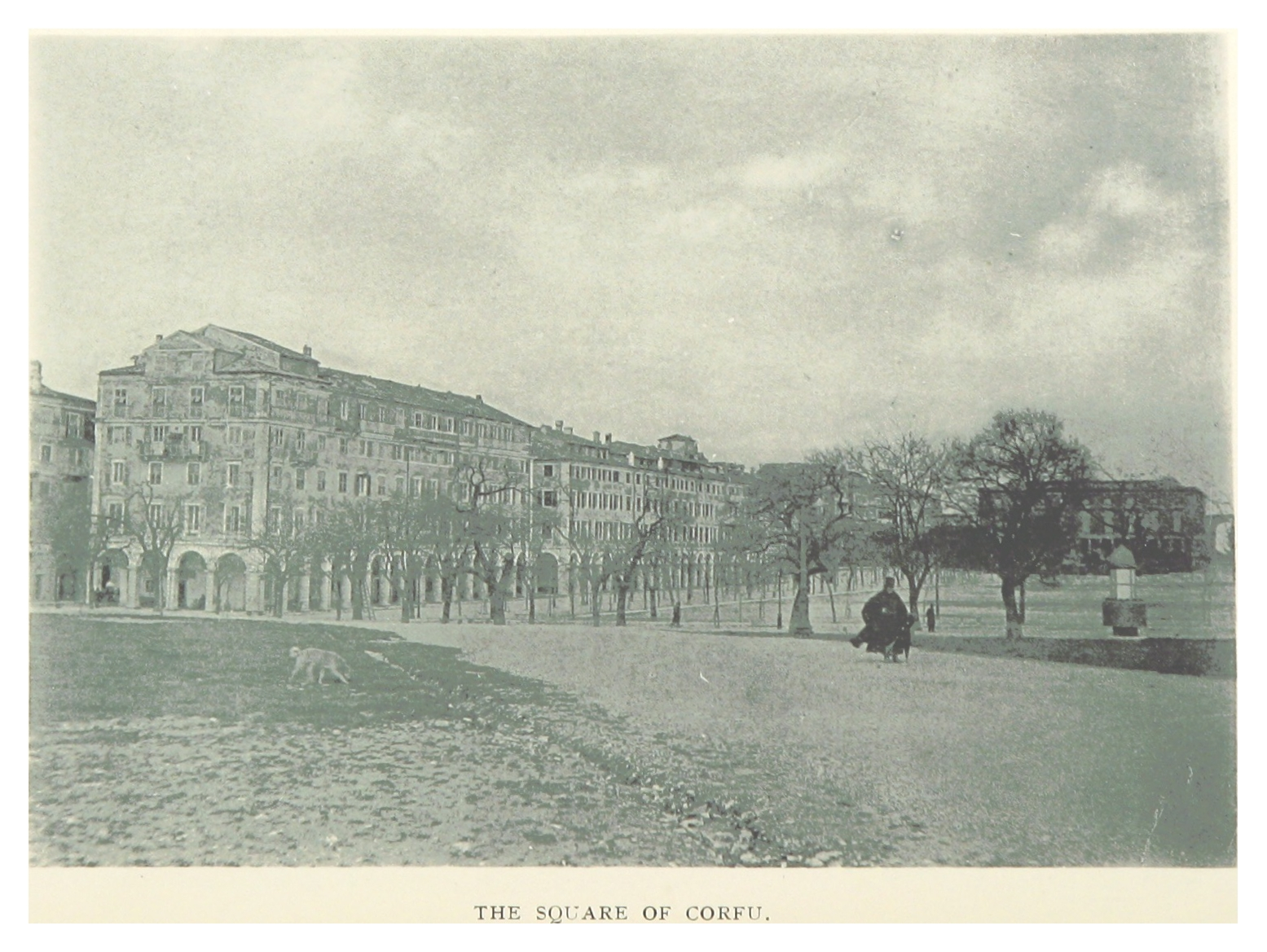
Artistic depiction of the Spianada in 1895.

The name of the square is derived from the Venetian word for an "open flat area," reflecting the four centuries of Venetian rule over the island of Corfu.

Its current form dates back to the temporary period of French occupation of the Ionian Islands, including Corfu, during the Napoleonic Wars.

The cricket ground, a major part of the park, occupies a significant portion of the square. The local passion for cricket is of British origin, dating back to the period of the British Protectorate (1814–1864).

The square is one of the most central and popular landmarks of the city, serving as a major attraction for tourists.

The Spianada fountain, or Vagianos well to the locals, was a donation by the Greek physician and benefactor Georgios Vagianos, originally from Konya in Asia Minor.

== Gallery ==
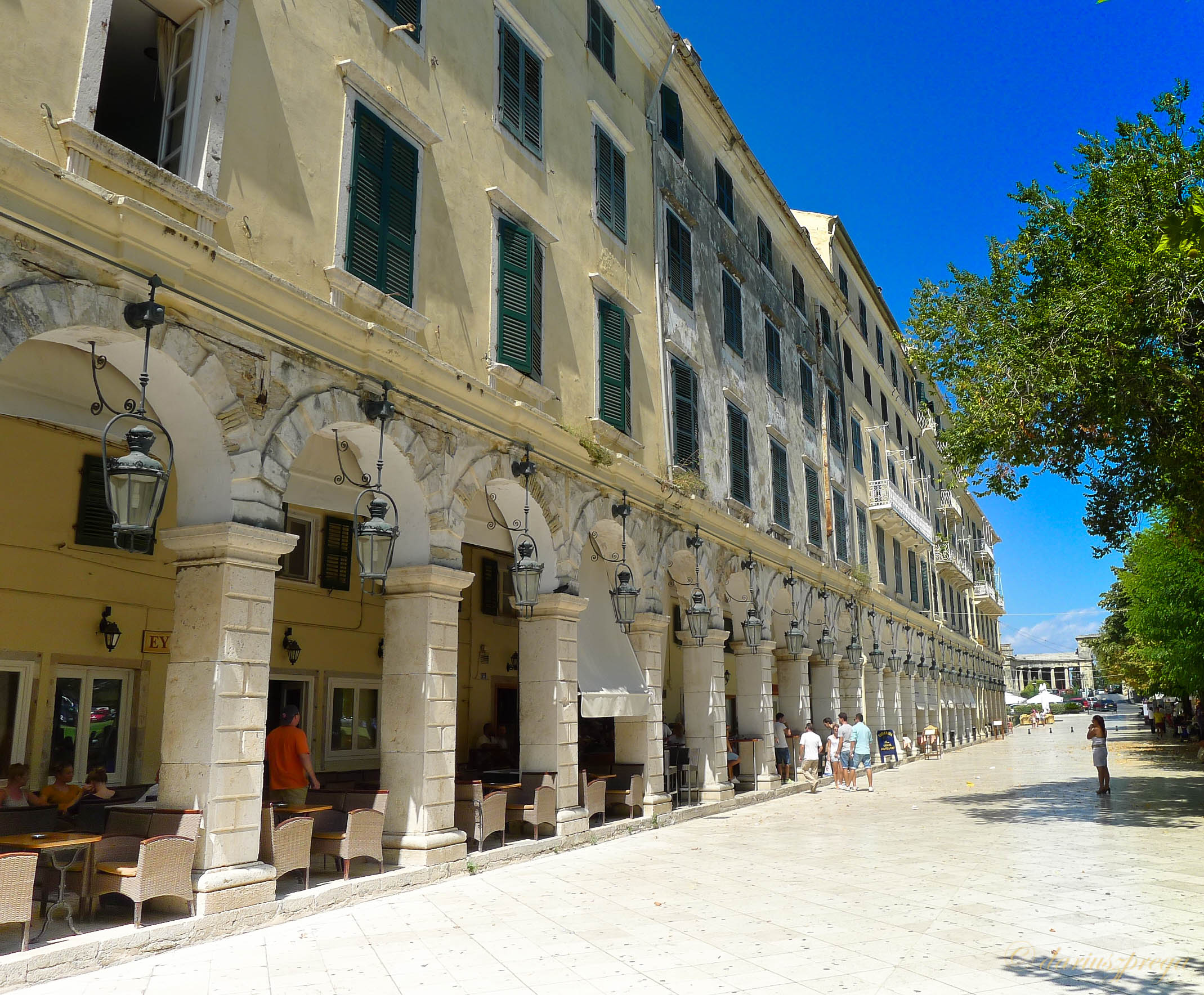
Arcades of the Liston.

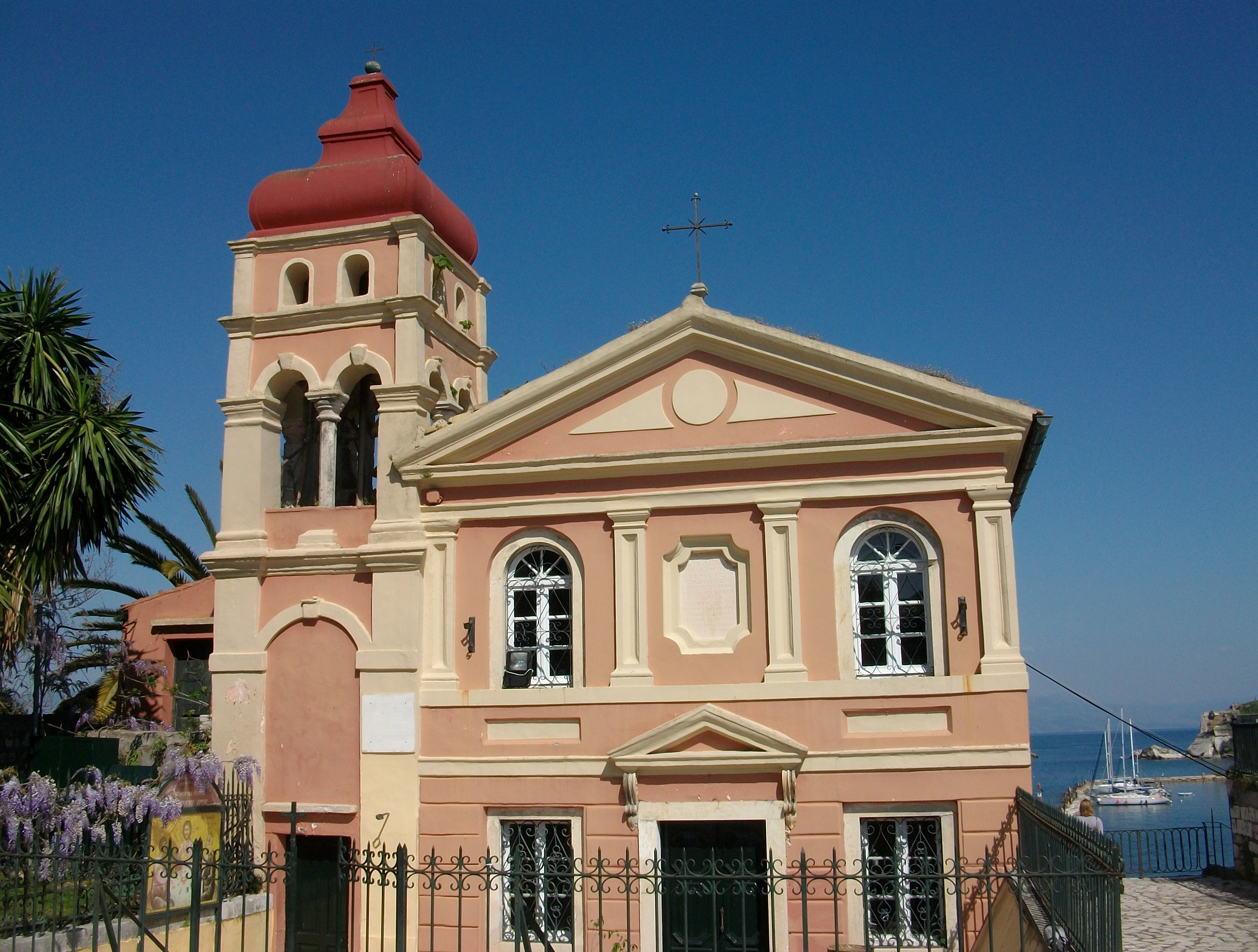
View of the Church of Panagia Mandrakina.

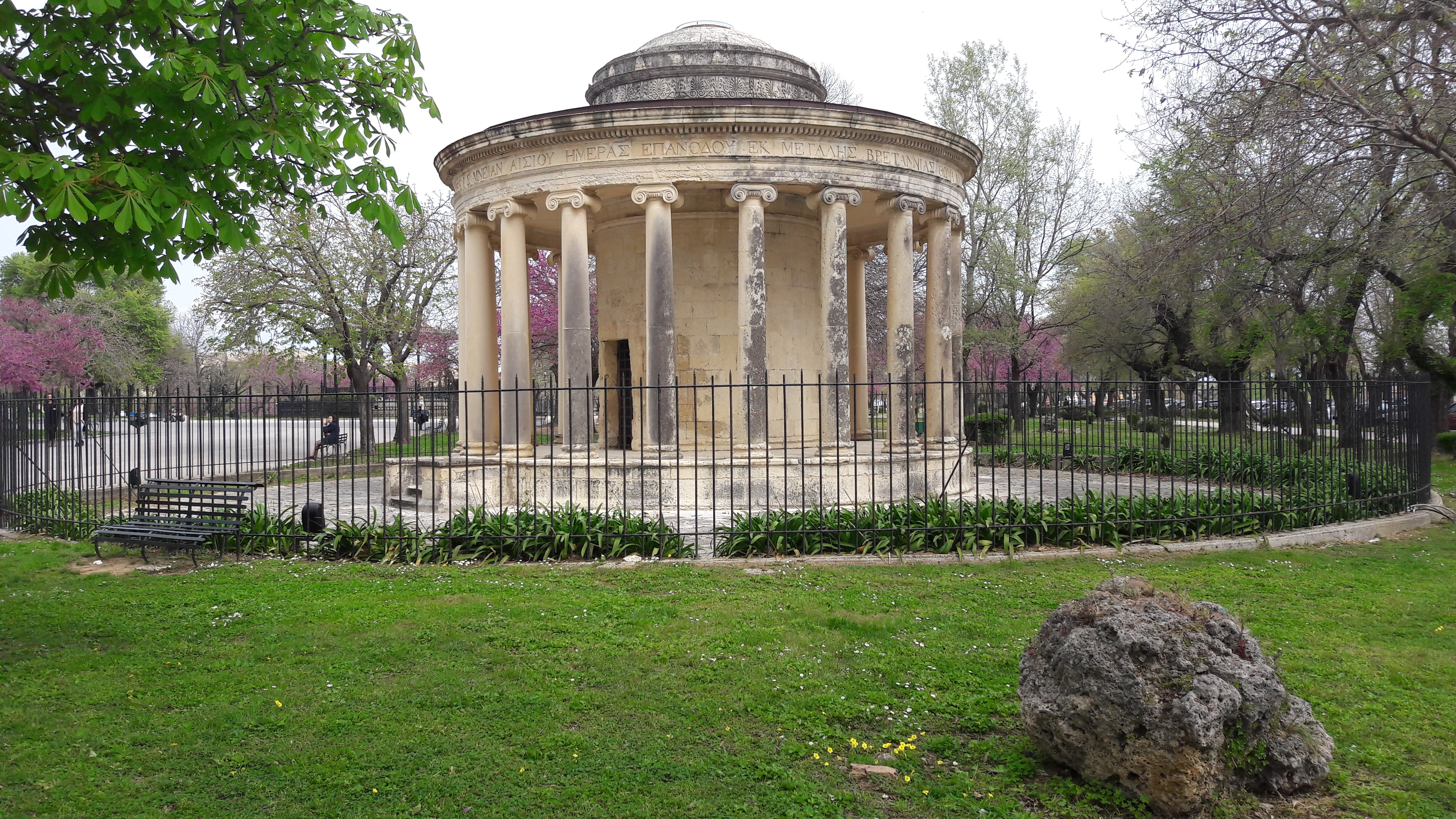
The Maitland Rotunda.

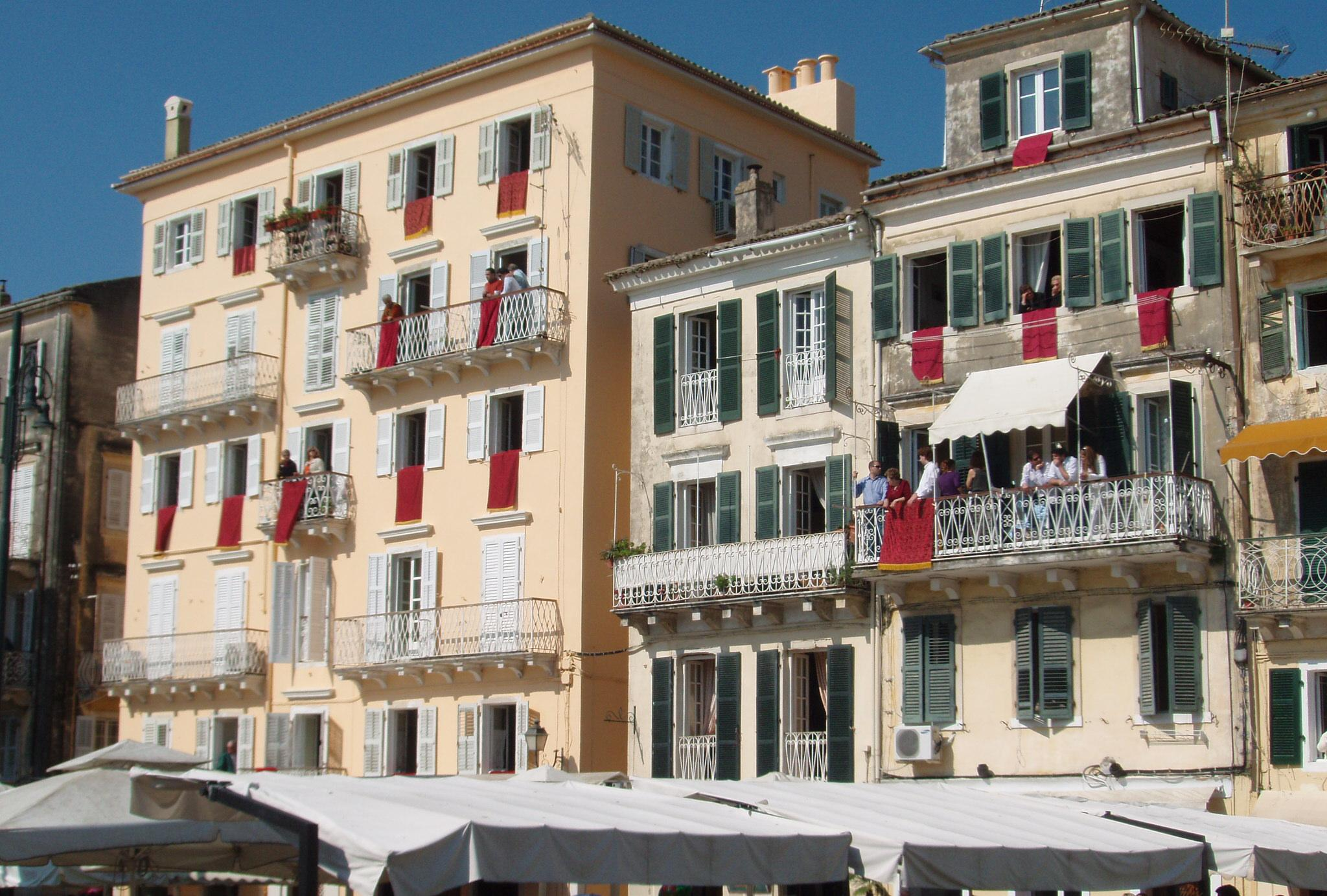
Traditional houses overlooking the square.

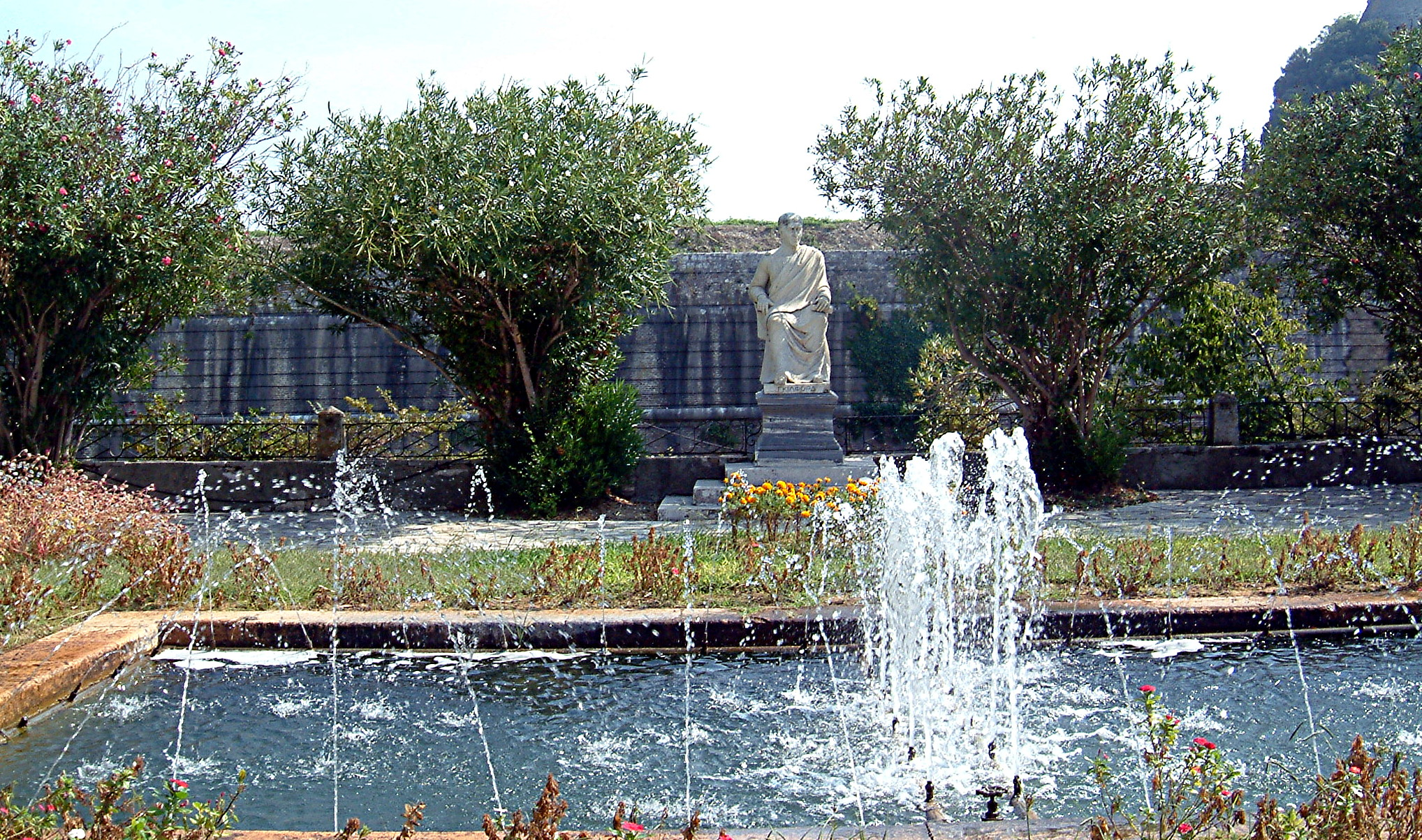
View of the fountain in the square.

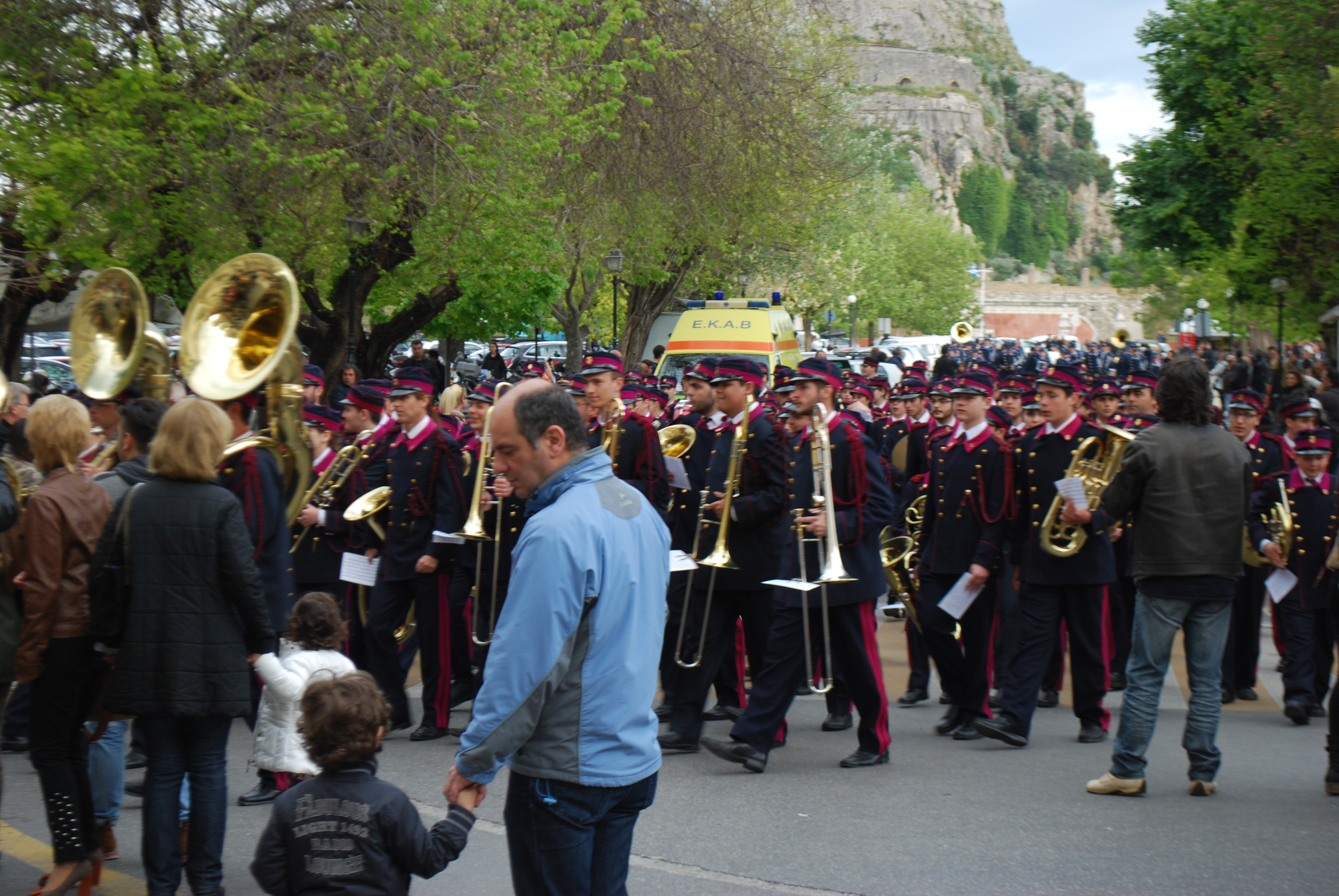
A Philharmonic Society performing during an event.
