= Kapodistrias Philharmonic Union =

"Kapodistrias" Philharmonic Union
- Φιλαρμονική Ένωση Κέρκυρας «Ο Καποδίστριας»
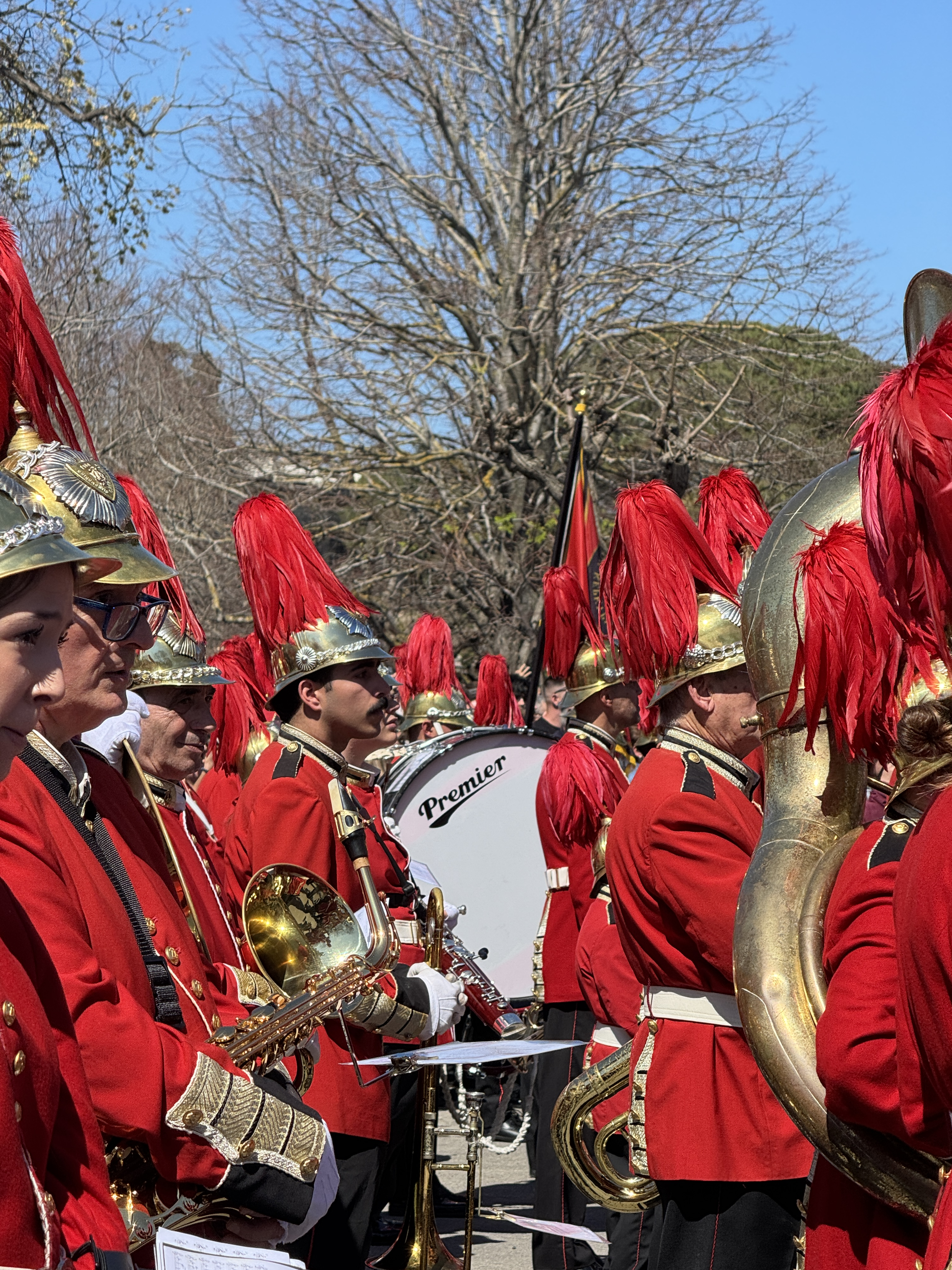
- The "Gran Cassa" of the philharmonic at the March 25th parade
- Nickname: Kapodistrias
- Formation: April 18, 1980; 46 years ago
- Type: Philharmonic
- Location: Corfu, Greece
- Members: ~350 (total) / ~150 (main body)
- Chief Musician: Spyros Atsopardis
- Colors: Red, Black, White

The "Kapodistrias" Philharmonic Union (commonly known as the Kapodistrias Philharmonic) is a musical and educational organization based in Corfu. Founded in 1980, it is one of the three major philharmonic societies of the city of Corfu, along with the Philharmonic Society of Corfu (Palaia) and the Mantzaros Philharmonic Society.

== History ==
The Philharmonic was founded on April 18, 1980. Its creation stemmed from the need for housing and musical expression of young musicians, on the initiative of members of the Corfiot society. It was named in honor of the Corfiot first Governor of Greece, Ioannis Kapodistrias. The first official public appearance of the music body took place on New Year's Day 1981.

== Structure and education ==
=== Schools ===
The Philharmonic operates schools for:

- Woodwinds (flute, clarinet, saxophone, oboe)
- Brass (trumpet, horn, trombone, tuba)
- Percussion
- Theoretical classes

== Appearance ==
The musicians' uniform consists of a bright red tunic, black trousers with a red stripe on the side, and a helmet with a red plume.

== Artistic activity ==
The Philharmonic traditionally participates in the events of the Corfiot Easter, accompanying the Epitaph of the Metropolis on the evening of Good Friday and participating in the Procession of Saint Spyridon on the morning of Holy Saturday.

It has made significant appearances outside Corfu, such as:

- At the Athens Concert Hall
- At the Odeon of Herodes Atticus
- In festivals abroad (Italy, France)

== Chief musicians ==
The first chief musician was Charilaos Maniatopoulos. Other former chief musicians include Georgios Peroulis and Michalis Michalopoulos, while the position is now held by Michalis Michalopoulos with Deputy Chief Musician Giorgos Rengis.
