= Saint Spyridon Church =

Coordinates: 39.6251°N 19.9227°E

- Ιερός Ναός Αγίου Σπυρίδωνος
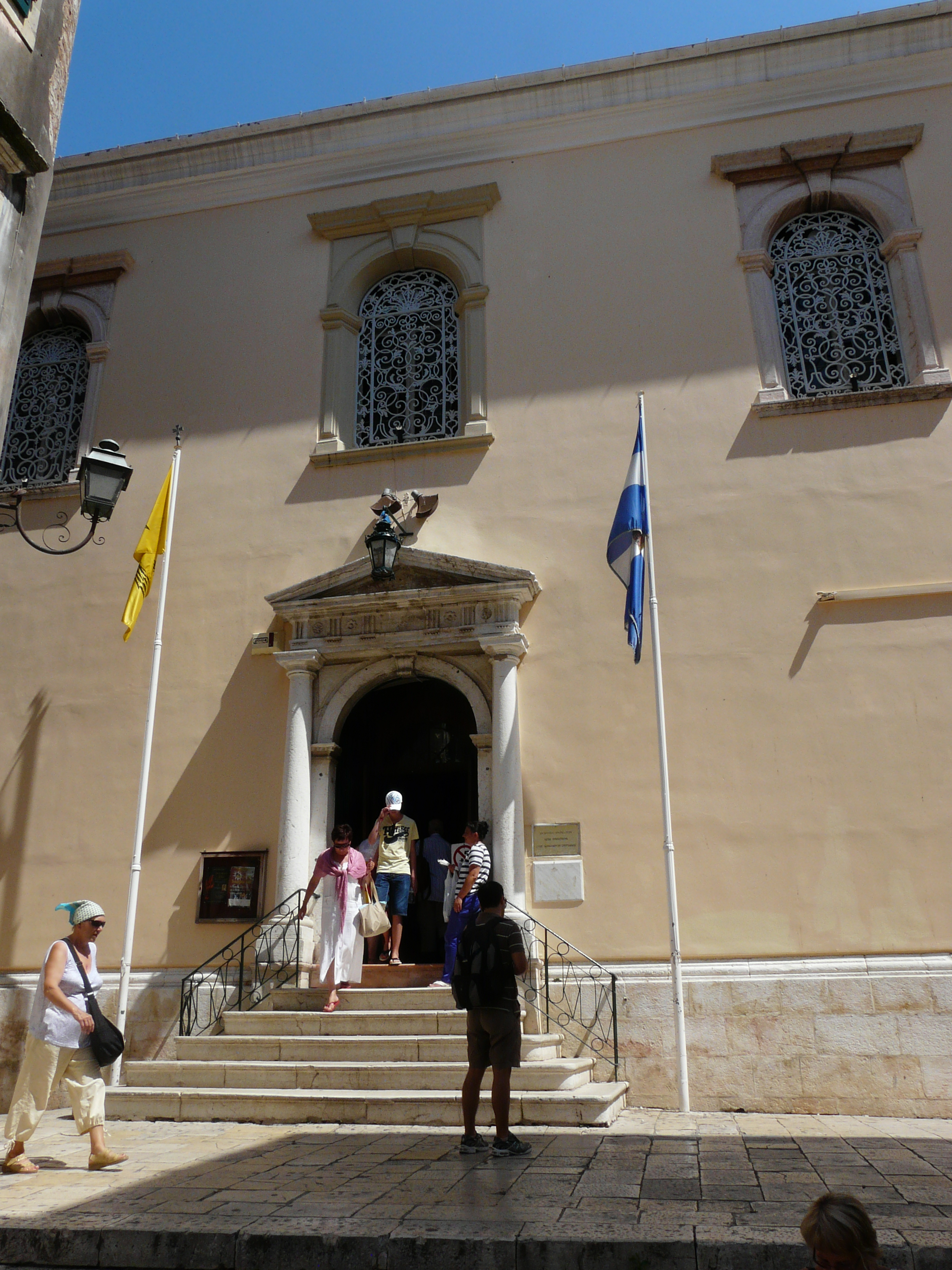
- Saint Spyridon Church
- Location: Corfu
- Country: Greece
- Denomination: Greek Orthodox

History
- Dedication: Saint Spyridon

Administration
- Archdiocese: Metropolis of Kerkyra, Paxoi and the Diapontian Islands

Saint Spyridon Church is a Greek Orthodox church located in Corfu, Greece. It was built in 1589. It houses the relics of Saint Spyridon and it is located in the old town of Corfu. It is a single-nave basilica and its bell tower, built in 1620, is the highest in the Ionian Islands. It is the most famous church in Corfu.

== History ==
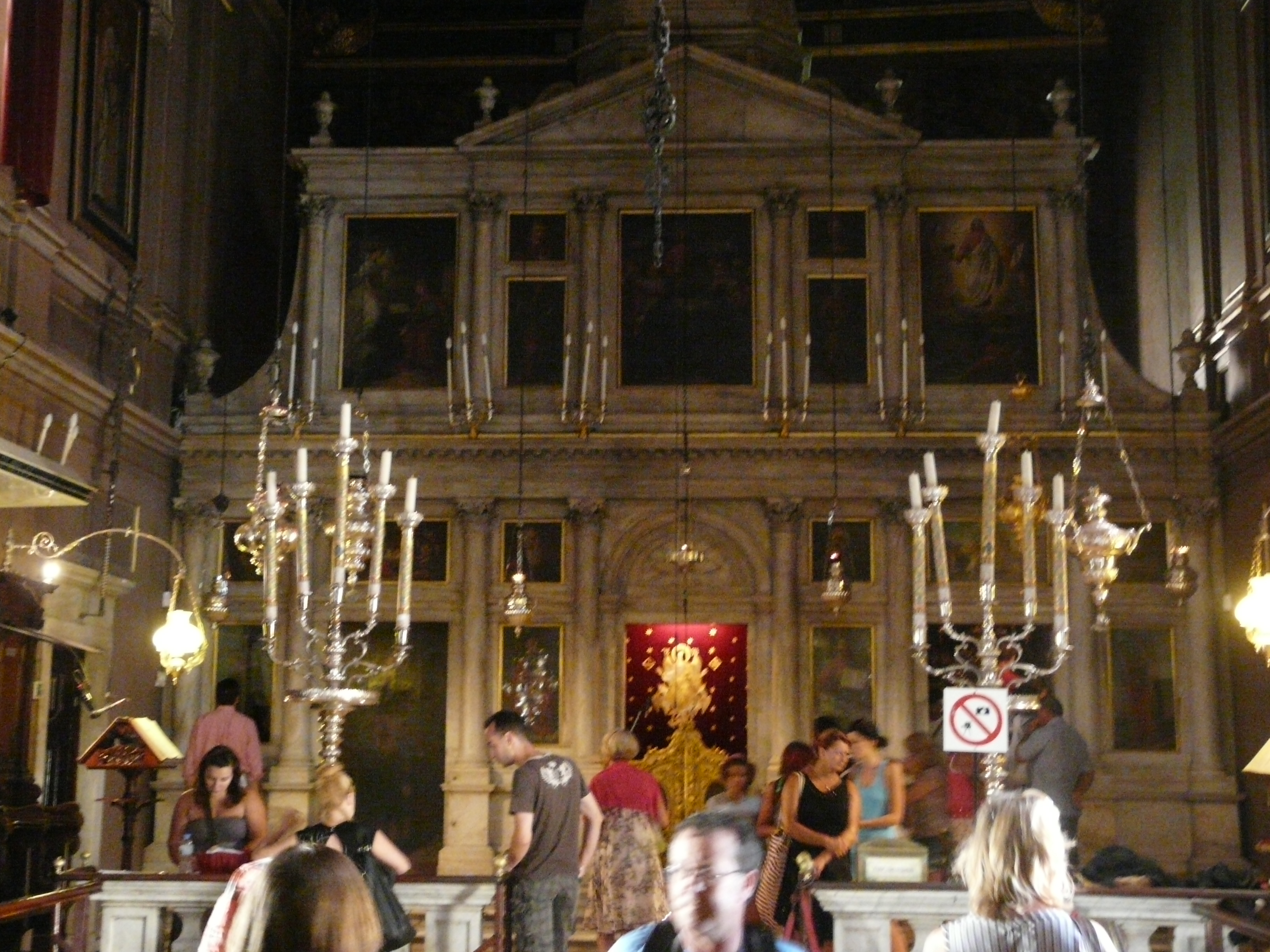
The iconostasis

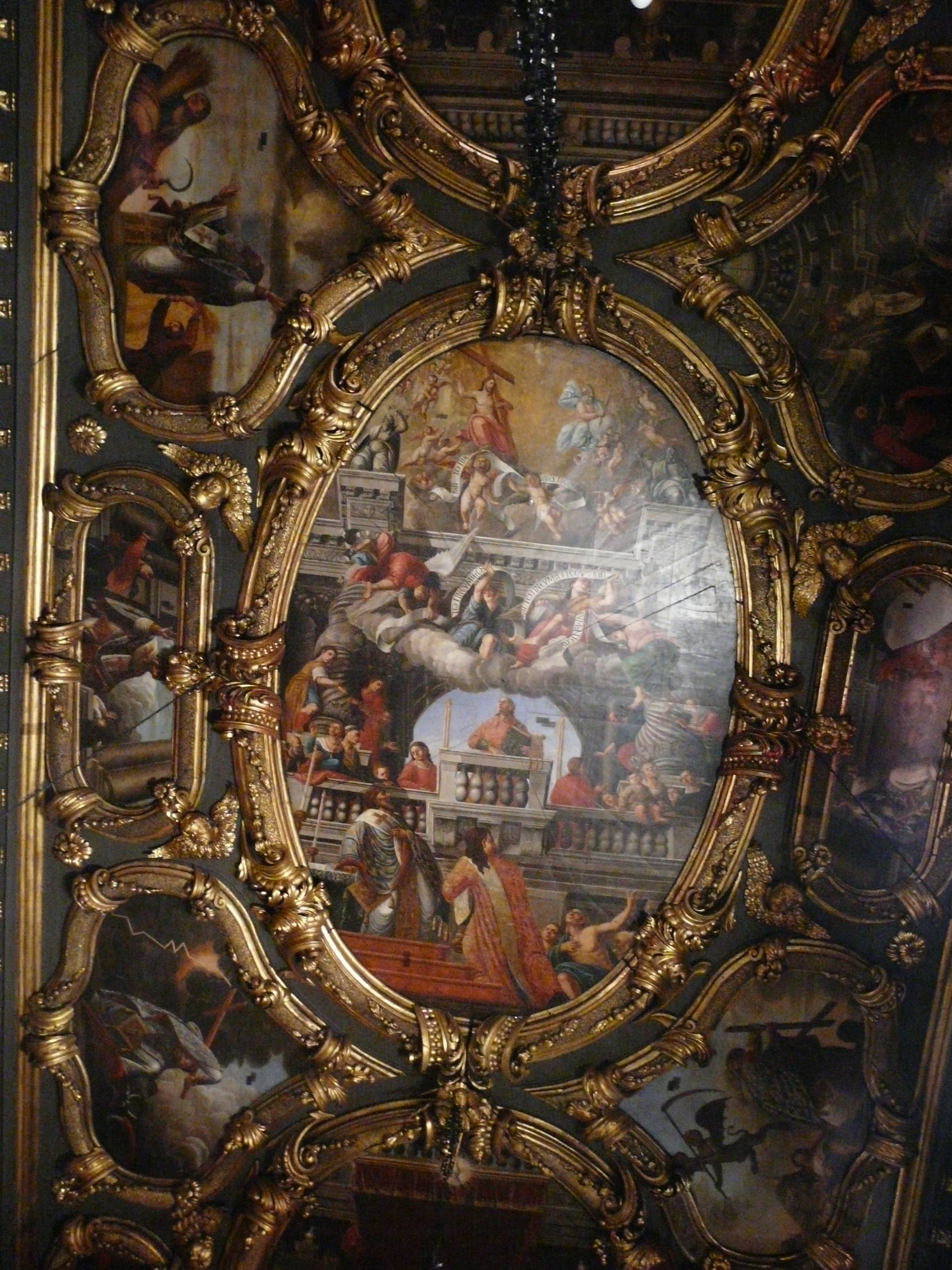
The painted ceiling by Panagiotis Doxaras

According to traditional accounts, in 1489, after the fall of the Byzantine Empire, the relics of St. Spyridon and St. Theodora, were brought to Corfu from Constantinople by Greek monk Georgios Kalochairetis, who was also a person of wealth, and were kept as property of his family. Later, when his daughter Asimia married one of the scions of the Voulgari family in Corfu she was given the remains of the saint as part of her dowry.

Subsequently, the relics of St. Spyridon were housed in a private church owned by the Voulgaris family. The Voulgaris church was located in the San Rocco suburb of Corfu city but had to be demolished when the outer city fortifications were built by the Venetians to protect the citadel after the first great siege of Corfu by the Ottomans in 1537. In the 1580s, after the demolition of the private church, the saint's remains were moved to their present location in a new church which was built within the city fortifications in the Campiello district of the old town. The bell tower of the church is similar in design to its contemporary Greek Orthodox church of San Giorgio dei Greci located in Venice.

== Interior ==
Inside the church there is a chapel to the right of the iconostasis where the remains of the Saint are kept in a double sarcophagus. The larger of the two contains the smaller one in its interior and is wooden with silver leaf trim. The smaller sarcophagus is surfaced in red velvet and has a removable bottom to facilitate changing the slippers of the saint.

The lack of any underground chamber to house the remains of the saint was part of a deliberate design plan to make them as accessible as possible. In the crypt there are 53 incense burners hanging from the ceiling, 18 of which are golden and the rest made of silver.

The front of the marble iconostasis resembles the exterior of the entrance of a baroque-style church. The ceiling of the church is divided into segments depicting scenes from St. Spyridon's life and miracles. The original painter of the church ceiling was Panagiotis Doxaras who created the works in 1727. With the passage of time the Doxaras paintings rotted away and subsequently they were replaced by copies painted by Nikolaos Aspiotis, a member of the Aspiotis family of Corfu. The only remaining trace of Doxaras's work is the gilded border of the iconography.

=== House of Romanov ===
Above the western door of the narthex the imperial coat of arms of the House of Romanov stands as a reminder that the church was under the nominal protection of Russia from 1807-1917. Near the same area a painting depicts the saint touching the head of Constantius II curing the emperor from illness.

=== Venetian tributes ===
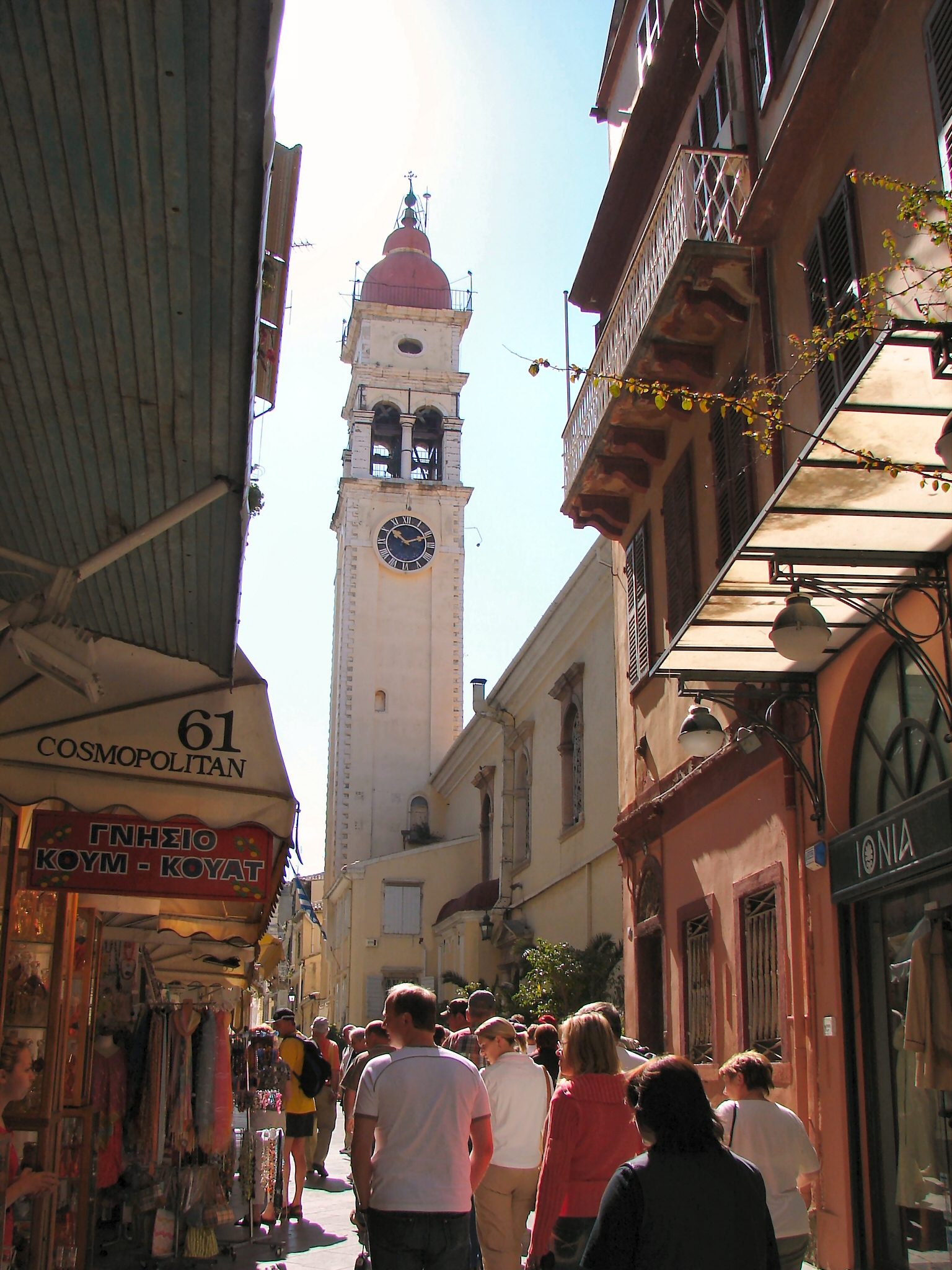
View of the belltower.

The Venetian Senate offered a gilded silver lamp bearing the reliefs of the Saint and the lion of St. Mark in commemoration of the miracles of the Saint during the second great siege of Corfu in 1716. The lamp is hanging at the west corner of the nave near the women's quarters. The inscription on the lamp reads as follows:

OB SERVATAM CORCYRAM DIVO SPVRIDIONI TVTELARI SENATVS VENETVS ANNO MDCCXVI

Which translates as: "For the Salvation of Corfu, to the Patron Saint Spyridon, the Senate of Venice, 1716 AD".

The largest lamp in the church is found near the pulpit and was offered to the saint by the Venetian High Admiral Andrea Pisani and the rest of the Venetian leaders with the inscription:

DIVO SPVRIDIONI TVTELARI VTRAQVE CLASSE PROTECTA ANDREA PISANI SVPREMO DVCE VTRIVSQVE CLASSIS NOBILES EX VOTO ANNO MDCCXVII

Which translates: "To the Patron Saint Spyridon for having protected the two fleets under the leadership of Andrea Pisani, Commander in Chief of both fleets, the nobles in votive offering, AD 1717".
