= Mantzaros Philharmonic Society =

"Mantzaros" Philharmonic Society
- Φιλαρμονική Εταιρεία Μάντζαρος
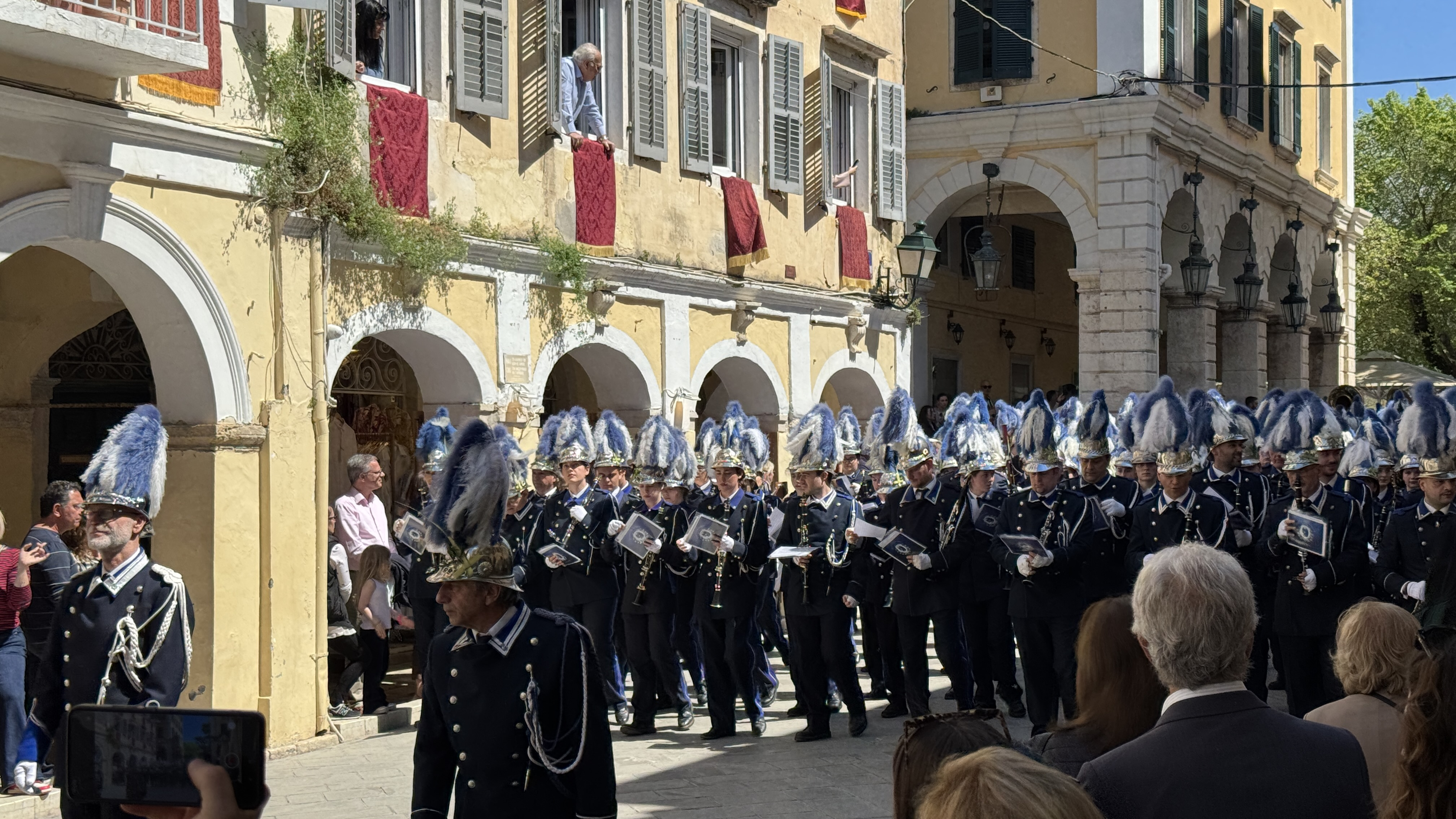
- Abbreviation: FEM
- Nickname: Mantzaros
- Formation: November 18, 1890; 135 years ago
- Type: Philharmonic
- Purpose: Non-profit Educational Organization
- Location: Corfu, Greece
- President: Ioannis Trivizas
- Awards: Academy of Athens Award (1987); "ROBERT SCHUMAN" Institute Award (2005); 1st Gold Award World Orchestra Festival Vienna (2016)
- Website: femantzaros.com

The "Mantzaros" Philharmonic Society (FEM) is a music-educational organization based in Corfu.

The "Mantzaros" Philharmonic Society was founded in June 1890 by a group of young people who two years earlier had created the "Recreational Cooperative". It is thus the second oldest philharmonic society in Corfu, after the Philharmonic Society of Corfu. The new philharmonic society was named after the composer Nikolaos Mantzaros, the founder of the Ionian School of Music.

Its first chief musician was Anastasios Rinopoulos, a founding member of FEM and son of the first president of the Philharmonic Society of Corfu, Gerasimos Rinopoulos. The first president of the Board of Directors of the "Mantzaros" Philharmonic Society was Leonidas Vlachos.

The first public appearance of the band of the "Mantzaros" Philharmonic Society took place on Sunday, November 4, 1890, during the procession of the holy relic of Saint Spyridon, the patron saint of Corfu. In 1896, it participated in the events for the first modern Olympic Games in Athens, and it was the one that played the National Anthem at the Opening Ceremony. In 1954, it became the first philharmonic in Greece to include a female musician in its body.

The Mantzaros Philharmonic Society maintains a series of musical ensembles, the most famous of which is its band. It also maintains a School of Music, which includes schools of music theory, woodwinds, brass, percussion, and piano, while it also has a learning department for children with learning difficulties.

It has been awarded for its educational, artistic, and cultural contribution in 1987 by the Academy of Athens and in 2005 by the Institute for the Cultural Integration of Europe "ROBERT SCHUMAN", while in July 2016 it received the 1st gold award at the International Festival of Musical Ensembles, World Orchestra Festival Vienna, in Vienna.

== Activities ==
- In 1896, FEM participated in the artistic events of the first modern Olympic Games in Athens.
- Before the war, it was the only Philharmonic that accepted students from the Jewish Community into its ranks.
- In 1950, it founded a Vocal School.
- In 1952, it founded a Symphony Orchestra.
- In 1954, for the first time in Greece, female musicians appeared with the "Mantzaros" Music Body.
- In 1974, it created a Student Band (Bantina).
- In 1982, it founded a Majorettes department. The same year, impressive appearances of the Music Body took place at the Philharmonic Festival in Bulgaria, as well as at the Closing Ceremony of the European Athletics Championships, at the Panathenaic Stadium.
- In 1985, together with the Majorettes department, appearances were made in Rhodes and Bulgaria.
- In 1986, it took part in the Opening Ceremony of the European Volleyball Championships in Athens.
- In 1987, it received the Academy of Athens award for its contribution to our country's music education.
- In 1990, for the celebration of the Society's centenary, a grand Concert of the Music Body, the Bantina, and the Majorettes department took place at the "Pallas" theater in Athens.
- In 1991, with the Music Body and the Majorettes department, it took part in the Opening Ceremony of the 8th World Men's Junior Handball Championship at the Peace and Friendship Stadium (SEF).
- In 1993, it gave a concert at the "Pallas" Theater in Athens, as part of the celebrations for the "Kapodistrias" year.
- In 1996, upon invitation from the Cultural Department of the Municipality of Vienna, in collaboration with the Austrian Wind Band Association, FEM participated in the 17th Pan-European Philharmonic Festival of Vienna, that is, in a Pan-Austrian event with international participation. The "Mantzaros" Philharmonic worthily represented the Musical tradition of Corfu and Greece in general in the "world capital" of music.
- In 2000, the FEM Bantina took part, together with the Band from Bad Saarow of Hanover, in concerts in Hanover and Berlin, as part of the International Trade Fair "Expo 2000 Hanover".
- In 2003, it held a Concert at the hall of the Greek National Opera.
- In 2005, FEM was Awarded by the Institute for the Cultural Integration of Europe, "ROBERT SCHUMAN", for its contribution to culture.
- In 2007, it participated in the grand military parade of Thessaloniki, to celebrate the anniversary of October 28th.
- In 2009, "MANTZAROS", in collaboration with the Choir of Corfu, gave a festive concert with works by Ionian composers at the Friends of Music Hall of the Athens Concert Hall, for the anniversary of the establishment of the first two stanzas of the "Hymn to Liberty", by Nikolaos Halikiopoulos - Mantzaros, as the official National Anthem of Greece.
- In 2011, at the Thessaloniki Concert Hall, the Philharmonic gave a festive Concert, on the occasion of the reception of the holy relic of the hand of Saint Spyridon in Thessaloniki, as well as the 90 years since the founding of the refugee settlement of Triandria and the foundation of the Holy Church of Saint Spyridon in Triandria.
- In 2013, it participated in an international Philharmonic Festival in Bulgaria.
- From 2013 to 2016, in collaboration with the "ANTENNA" group, it undertook the screening for the first time in Corfu of opera performances from the "METROPOLITAN OPERA" of New York and ballet performances from "COVENT GARDEN" in London.
- On June 21, 2014, for the first time in Corfu, it gives and has established since then, an official Concert of the Music Body to celebrate World Music Day.
- In July 2014, it participated in the 2nd Lefkada Philharmonic Festival.
- In November 2014, it established the 1st Panhellenic Competition for Original Band Composition, which became International in 2017.
- In 2016, it was awarded by the Holy Metropolis of Corfu, Paxoi and the Diapontian Islands for its musical and cultural work.
- In July 2016 (29-31/7/16) it participated by invitation in the International Festival of Musical Ensembles in Vienna (World Orchestra Festival Vienna 2016), where in a Concert it gave on July 31 at the Friends of Music Hall "Musikverein", it was honored with the first Gold award among 19 musical ensembles from all over the world and the Chief Musician, Socrates Anthis, with the distinction of Excellent Maestro.
- In 2017, it participated and gave a Concert in Paphos, Cyprus, as part of the events for Paphos - European Capital of Culture 2017.
- In April 2019, the Philharmonic, invited by the Greek diaspora of the USA, traveled to New York, where it held a Concert and took part in the grand parade for the celebration of March 25th that takes place on 5th Avenue in Manhattan, accompanying the detachment of the Evzones of the Presidential Guard in the parade.
- In November 2019, it gave a Concert at the Teatro Communale of the city of Matera, Italy, as part of the events of the Summit of the Chambers of Commerce of Southern Europe.
- Every year, the Music Body of the "Mantzaros" Philharmonic holds at least four official concerts in Corfu, as well as two to three concerts outside Corfu, following relevant invitations.
- The Music Body of FEM participates continuously since its foundation in all scheduled annual religious and national events of the island.

The Music Body, in full composition, currently consists of 300 musicians.

Since September 2013, the Artistic Director and Chief Musician is the internationally renowned trumpeter and former musician of the "MANTZAROS" P.S., Socrates Anthis.

== Related bibliography ==
- Kardamis Kostas, THE BANDS OF CORFU, MUSIC ON THE STREETS, Kaleidoscope pub. (2019)
- Motsenigos, Spyros: Modern Greek music: a contribution to its history (1958)
