= The Stoning of Stephen (Skoufos) =

Painting by Philotheos Skoufos

Stoning of Stephen
- Λιθοβολισμός του Αγίου Στεφάνου (Greek), Lapidazione di Santo Stefano (Italian)
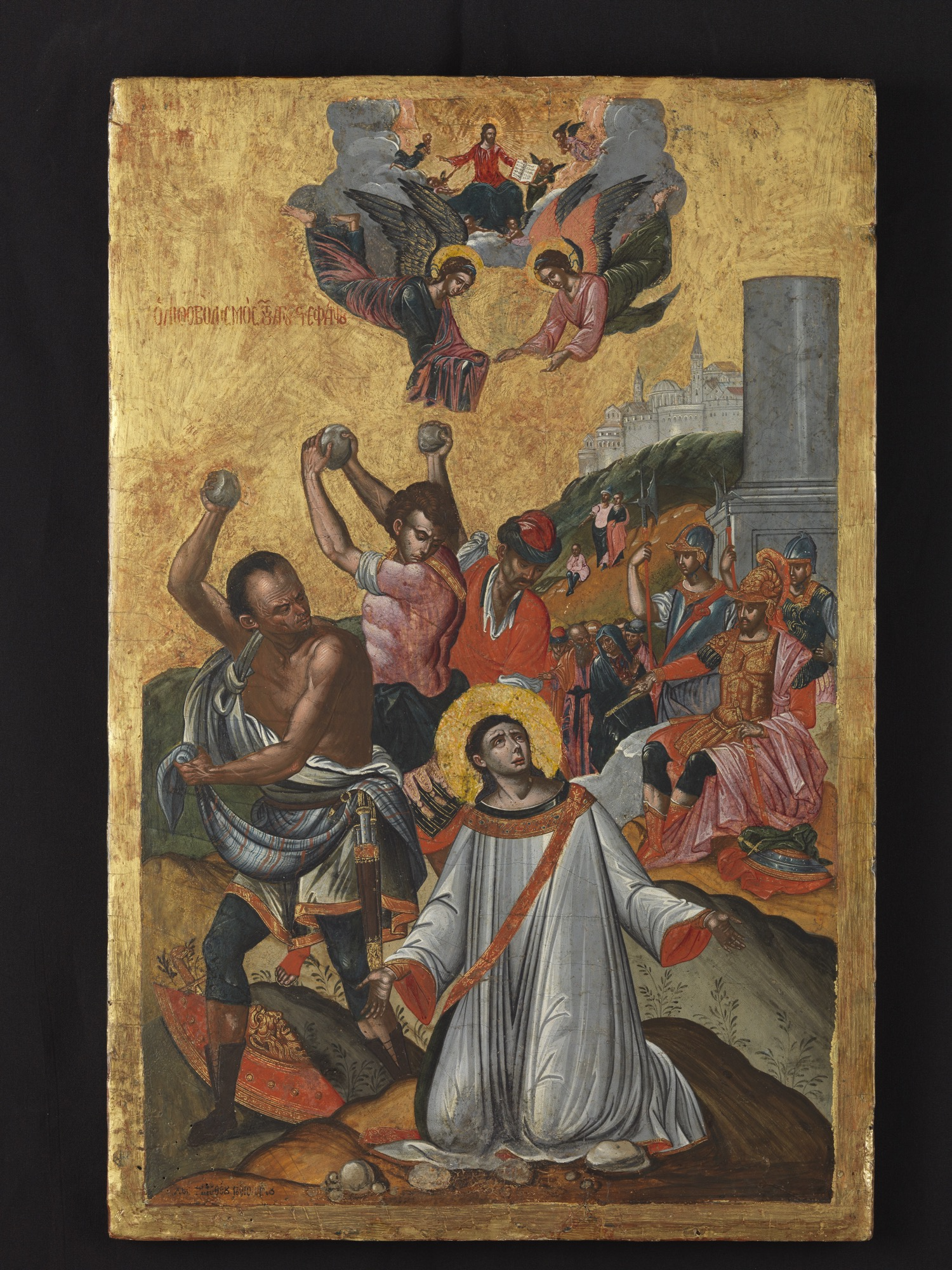
- Artist: Philotheos Skoufos
- Year: c. 1645–1685
- Catalogue: ΓΕ 826
- Medium: egg tempera paint, gold leaf
- Movement: Late Cretan School
- Subject: Stoning of Stephen the Protomartyr
- Dimensions: 59 cm × 39 cm (23.2 in × 15.3 in)
- Location: Metsovo Folk Art Museum, Metsovo, Ioannina, Greece
- Owner: Metsovo Folk Art Museum
- Website: Official Website

The Stoning of Stephen is a painting in tempera and gold leaf by Philotheos Skoufos. Skoufos was active on the island of Crete. He traveled to Venice and eventually settled on the island Zakynthos. He was briefly a priest at the famous Greek church in Venice San Giorgio dei Greci. Nineteen of his works have survived. Skoufos created notable copies of Damaskinos's paintings namely The Stoning of Stephen and The Beheading of John the Baptist.

Saint Stephen was the first martyr of Christianity and is considered a protomartyr. The protomartyr was stoned to death for following the Christian faith. The painting is a depiction of that scene. The Stoning of Stephen is a nearly identical copy of Damaskinos's work. The tempera painting is 1/3 smaller than the original masterpiece. There are four paintings that identically resemble his work created between 1640 and 1707 signed by master painters. Skoufos created two of them. This version is the most notable and in the best condition. Leonardo da Vinci's Last Supper was restored due to surviving copies of his work created by other artists. The copy of the Mona Lisa is known as the Prado Mona Lisa. The copy of Damaskinos's massive work can be found at the Metsovo Folk Art Museum in Metsovo, Ioannina, Greece. It was formerly part of the Dionysios Loverdos Collection.

== Description ==
The artwork is made of traditional egg tempera paint and gold leaf on a wood panel. The icon is almost three times smaller than the original. The height is 59 cm (23.2 in) and the width is 39 cm (15.3 in). The work of art is in very good condition and reconstructs Damaskinos's slightly damaged painting. Jerusalem is clearly visible in the background. The Virgin Mary appears with her disciples supporting the martyr. Behind the Virgin Mary, three figures appear on a hill. Another missing component in Damaskinos's work is the figure of Christ in the heavens. Christ sits on a cloud with an open book. He is surrounded by angels. The angels are prepared to reward the martyr. The figures establish the middle ground. The gold background distinguishes the work of art created for religious figures. It was a sign of respect.

There are slight variations between Damaskinos's version and the Skoufos icon. Saint Stephen is slightly centered. Skoufos creates more space in the foreground. To our right, the ground and landscape take up more space. Skoufos slightly reduces the size of Saint Stephen. He also creates more space for the other figures. The military figures are clearly visible. The main authoritative seated figure has an indifferent expression on his face. The three soldiers are wearing lavish costumes with intricate ornamentation. The artist creates spatial depth. The anticipatory stance of the three stoning figures initiates tension within the scene. The three figures holding stones demonstrate three-dimensionality. The shield on the ground to our left is fuller and the landscape more visible. The stones on the ground in front of Saint Stephen clearly establish the scene.

== Gallery ==
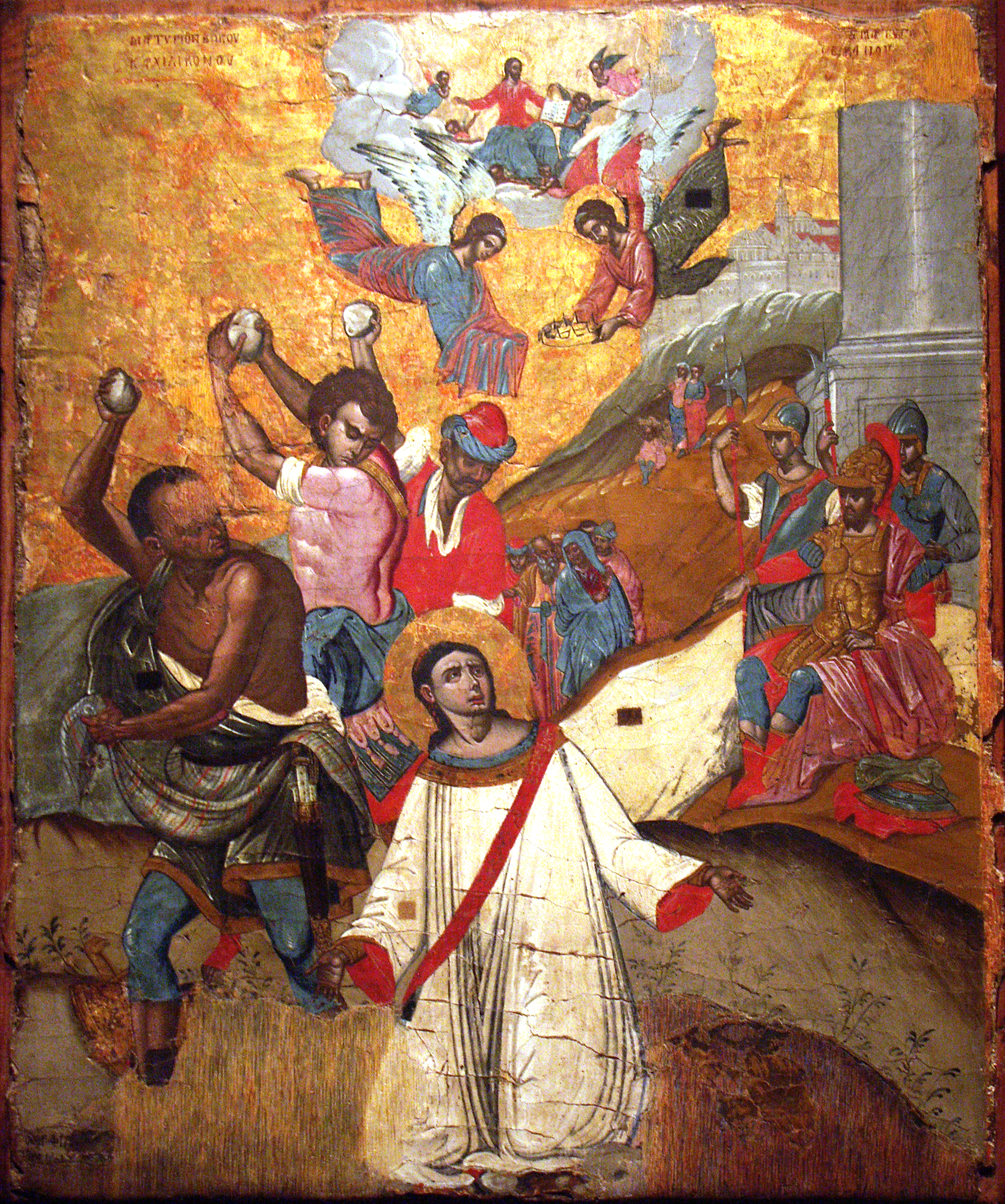
Second Skoufos Stoning of Stephen

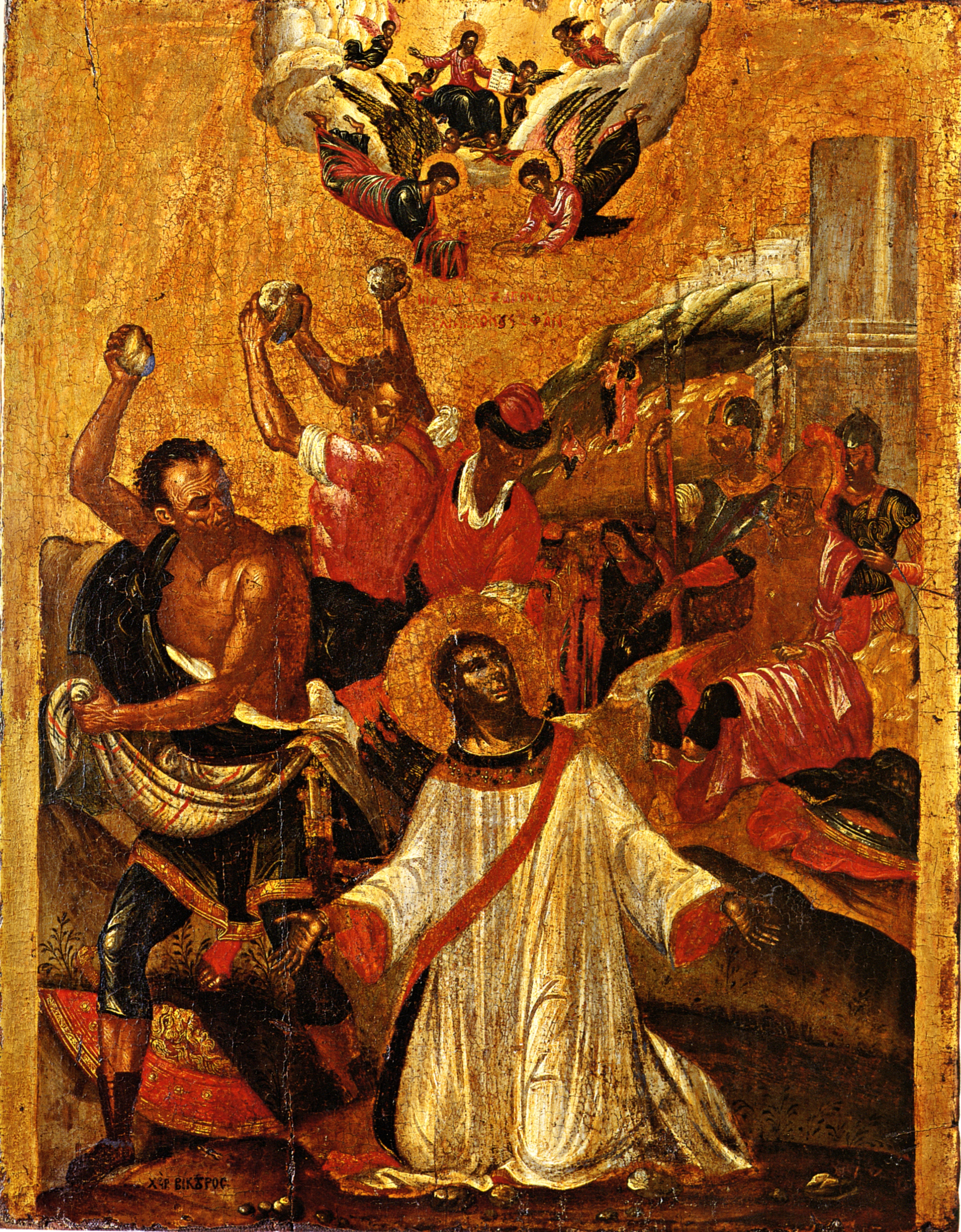
The Stoning of Stephen Victor

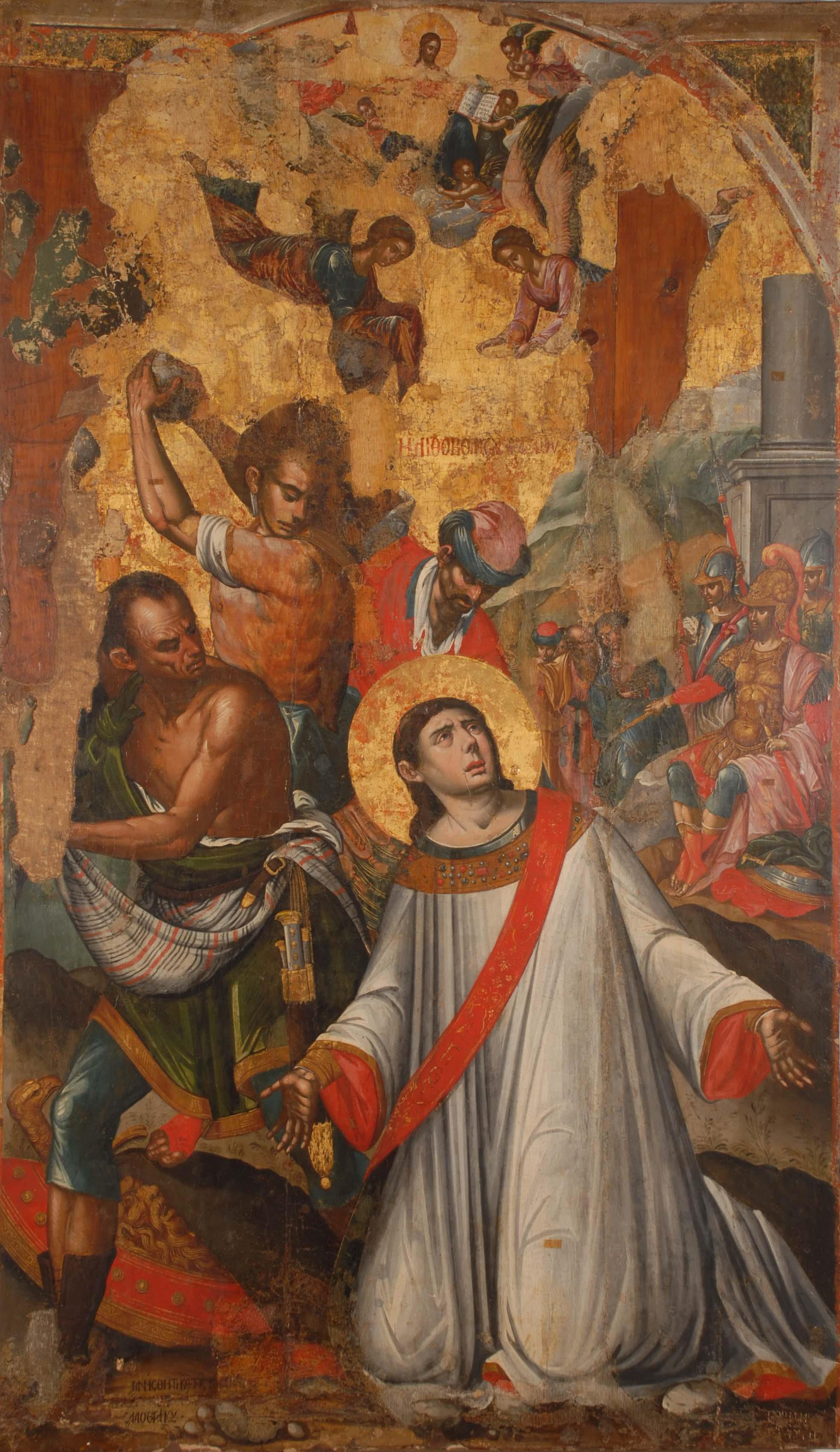
The Stoning of Stephen Damaskinos Original
