= Beheading of John the Baptist (Damaskinos) =

Painting by Michael Damaskenos

- Αποτομή Ιωάννου Προδρόμου (Greek), La Decollazione di San Giovanni Battista (Italian)
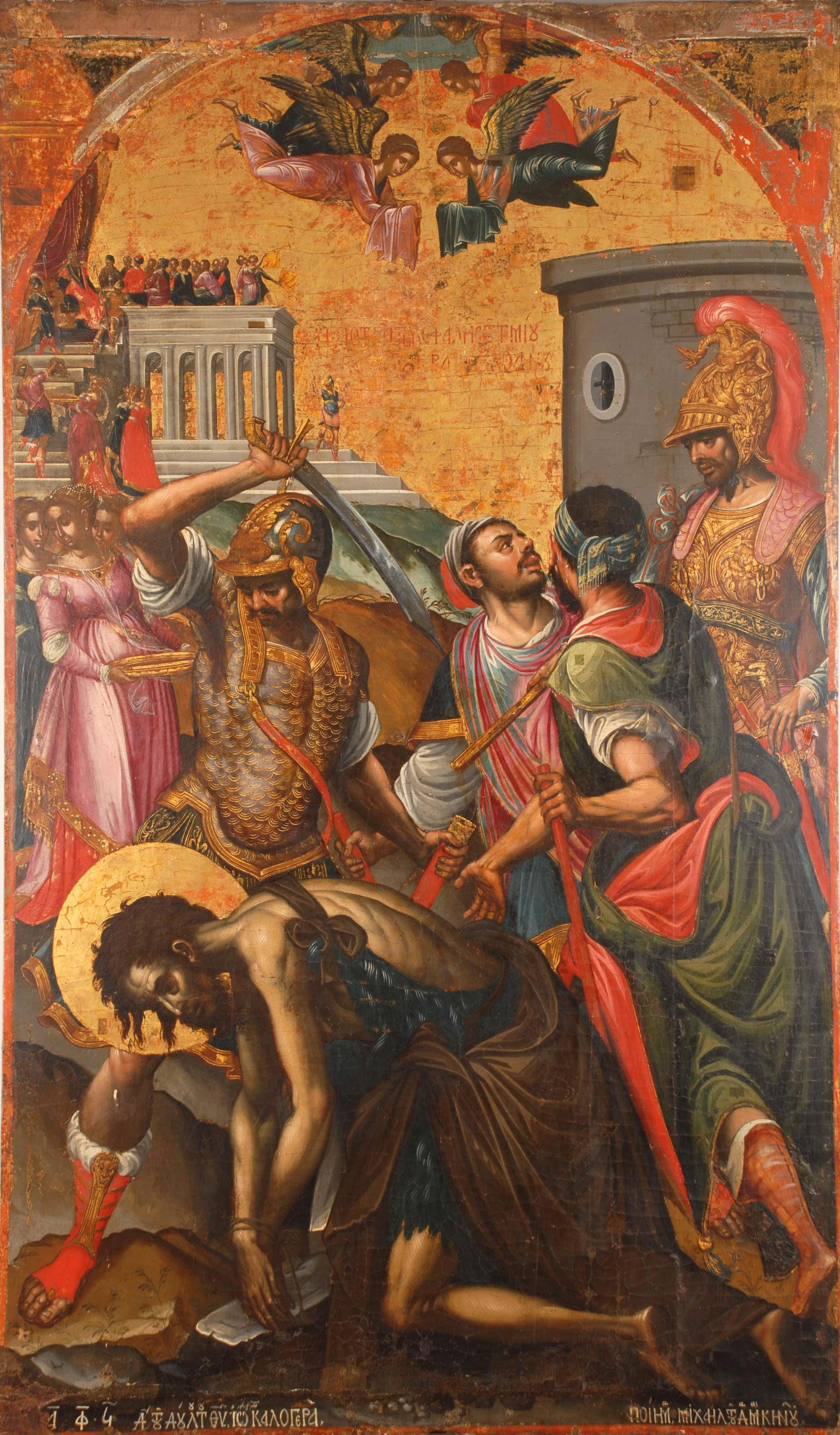
- Artist: Michael Damaskinos
- Year: c. 1590
- Medium: tempera on wood
- Movement: Cretan School
- Subject: Beheading of John the Baptist
- Dimensions: 165.5 cm × 97.5 cm (65.2 in × 38.4 in)
- Location: Municipal Gallery of Corfu, Corfu, Greece
- Owner: Municipal Gallery of Corfu
- Website: Official Website

The Beheading of John the Baptist was a painting made of egg tempera and gold leaf. It was similar in length to Damaschino's Stoning of Stephen. Michele Damaschino (c. 1530-1592) was a famous member of the Cretan school of painting. His contemporaries were El Greco and Georgios Klontzas. Damaschino was from Crete, he spent a large amount of time in Venice. While in Venice, and other parts of Italy, he adopted Italian mannerisms which he applied to his painting technique. The Beheading of John the Baptist was a popular theme among Greek and Italian painters.

The Beheading of John the Baptist, painted by Michael Damaskinos, was copied by countless Greek and Italian painters. The theme and painting style became a common prototype of the late Cretan school. Georgios Kastrofylakas and Philotheos Skoufos each painted their own version of the masterpiece. Damaschino's icon is very large, it is housed at the Municipal Gallery of Corfu in Corfu, Greece. The artwork is inside section A of the Palace of St. Michael and St. George. Damaskinos's Stoning of Saint Stephen is also at the same place.

== Description ==
The dimensions are 165.5 cm (65.2 in) x 97.5 cm (38.4 in) it was completed towards the end of the 16th century while the painter was on the island of Crete. The painting materials were egg tempera and gold leaf on wood. The painting is very large. The space on the painter's panel is similarly organized in both the Stoning of Stephen and the Beheading of John the Baptist. The artist uses the space in the foreground to display his characters. John the Baptist is about to be beheaded. A similar character from the Stoning of Stephen reappears. The high-ranking military official is dressed in the same attire. He is greeted by two of John's disciples. They plead for their leader. As seen in most of his works, Damaschino brilliantly employs the Italian Renaissance cangiante style.

The high-ranking soldier's uniform is very elaborately decorated. He has a dragon on his helmet. His facial expression is very serious. He has his hand on his sword. The second soldier is about to cut off Saint John's head. His uniform is also elaborately decorated. Viewers can clearly discern between the authoritative figure in the scene. John is kneeling, the figure is very dark, his eyes are closed. There is a gold halo around his head, but otherwise, he is dressed in his typical humble attire.

Salome is dressed in pink, waiting with her female flock. She patiently waits for the head of the martyr. In the background, another version of Salome climbs the stairs. A man holds John's head over the platter. Salome looks back at the audience with a pleasing smile. Trumpets are playing, Herod Antipas along with a huge procession await the arrival of the trophy.

== Gallery ==
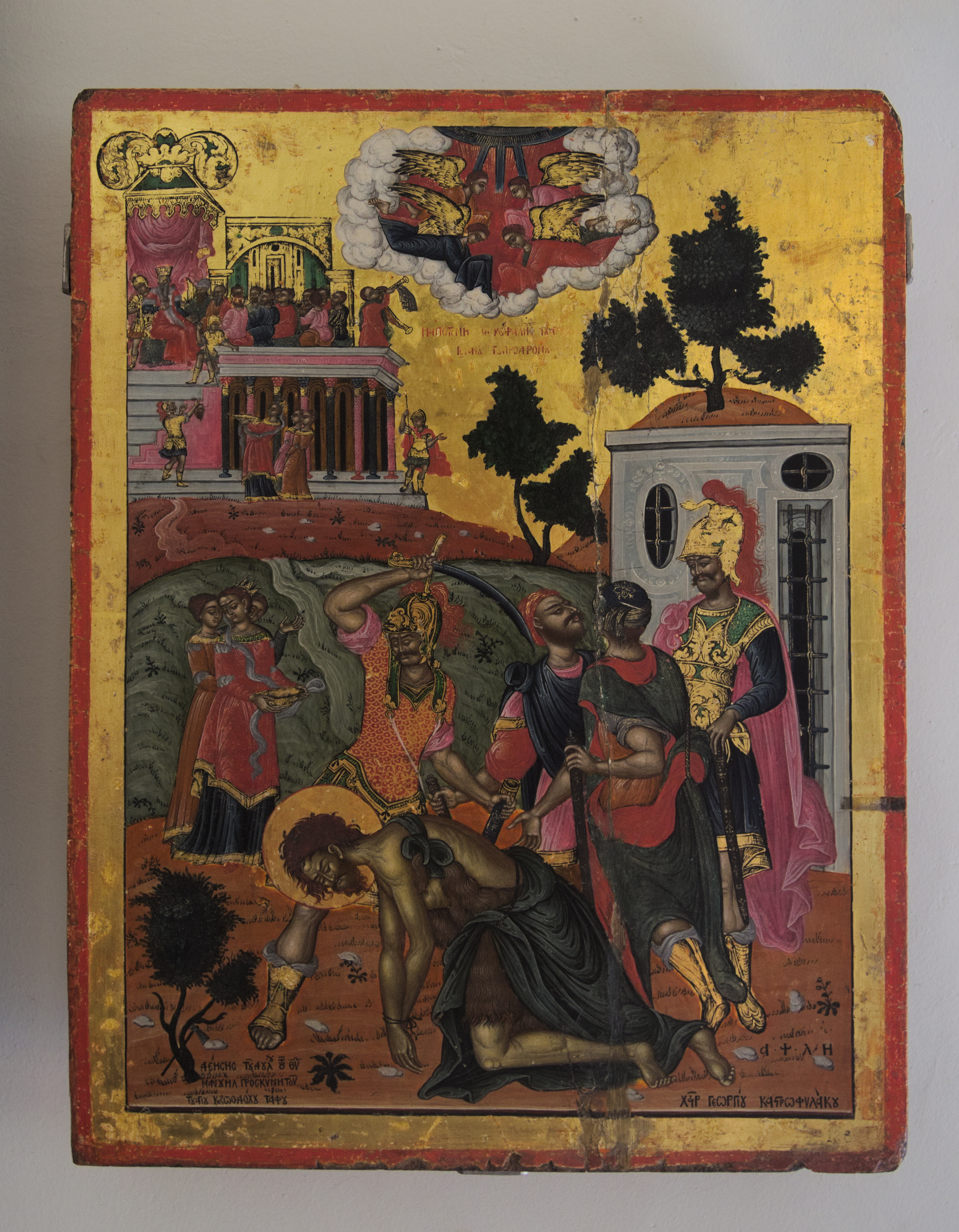
Beheading of John the Baptist
