= Stoning of Stephen (Damaskinos) =

Painting by Michael Damaskinos

- Λιθοβολισμός του Αγίου Στεφάνου (Greek), Lapidazione di Santo Stefano (Italian)
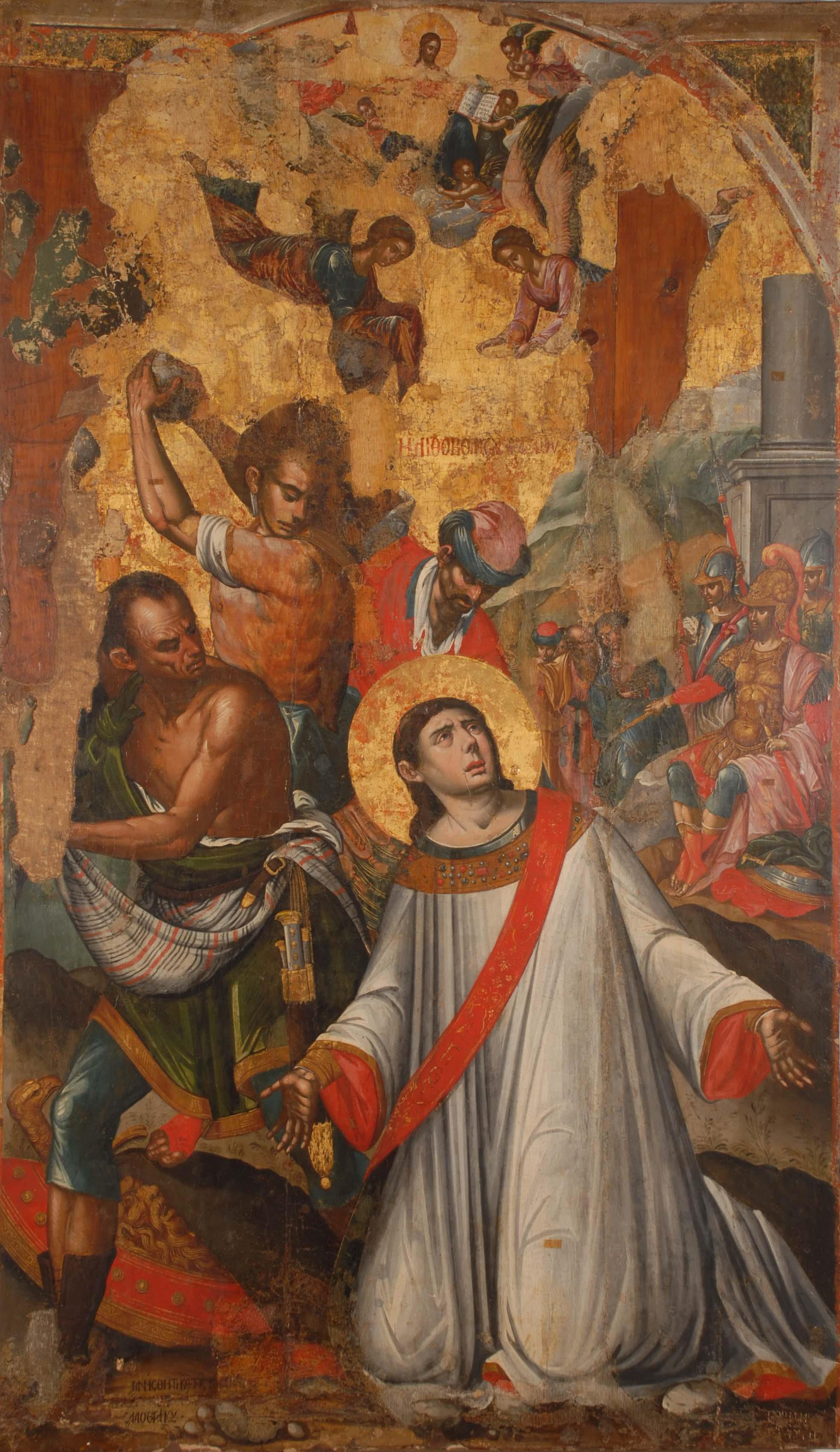
- Artist: Michael Damaskinos
- Year: c. 1591
- Medium: tempera on wood
- Movement: Cretan School
- Subject: Stoning of Saint Stephen
- Dimensions: 165.5 cm × 97.5 cm (65.2 in × 38.4 in)
- Location: Municipal Gallery of Corfu, Corfu, Greece
- Owner: Municipal Gallery of Corfu
- Website: Official Website

The Stoning of Saint Stephen is an egg tempera and gold leaf painting created by Greek master Michael Damaskinos. He was a member of the Cretan school. He integrated Venetian painting with the Greek mannerisms prevalent at the time. Damaskinos was active in Heraklion, Sicily, Venice, and other parts of Italy. The Stoning of Stephen has been depicted by countless Greek and Italian painters. Saint Stephen was a protomartyr. He was the first martyr of Christianity. He was stoned to death for following the new faith. The painting is a depiction of that event.

The most notable version was completed by Raphael's student Giulio Romano. The painting is a massive depiction of the Stoning of St. Stephen. Tintoretto also painted a similar version. There is a strong possibility Damaskinos was exposed to the paintings while in Italy. His version of the painting shared common characteristics. Damaskinos's rendition of the Stoning of Saint Stephen was copied by countless artists namely Philotheos Skoufos. Skoufis was exposed to his work while he was at the church San Giorgio dei Greci. The Damaskinos painting is over five feet tall. The massive icon is housed at the Municipal Gallery of Corfu in Corfu, Greece. The collection is inside of the Palace of St. Michael and St. George section A. Damaskinos's Beheading of John the Baptist is also at the same location.

== Description ==
The painting is egg tempera and gold leaf on wood. The painting is huge; it measures over five feet tall. The dimensions are 165.5 cm (65.2 in) x 97.5 cm (38.4 in) it was completed towards the end of the 16th century while the painter was in Crete. The painting follows the traditional maniera greca influenced by Venetian painting. The painter employs the Italian Renaissance cangiante style.

Stephen is the central figure. Similar to both the Romano and Tintoretto. He stands in the foreground. His facial expression relays a message of sorrow. Both Romano and Damaskinos capture this moment similarly. Damaskinos elegantly accentuates the striations and folds of fabric. Stephen is wearing elaborate jewelry around his collar. He is also depicted with a halo. A bright red decorated stole overlaps his torso. To his right or our left, a man holding a stone appears with a detailed expression on his face. His forehead and his body demonstrate the painter's ability to use colors, lines, and shadows to present his figures. Under the man lies an ornate shield depicting the lion of Venice. Damaskinos is blending first-century attire with clothing and objects prevalent during his lifetime. Three figures are throwing stones.

In the middle ground, a man sits observing the event. He was a high-ranking Roman soldier. The event followed a speedy trial based on the laws and customs of the time. Stephen did not have a trial like Jesus. The Roman soldier's armor is elaborately decorated. Once again, Damaskinos is mixing first-century attire with clothing prevalent during his lifetime. The Roman soldier wears the same armor in Damaskinos's Beheading of John the Baptist. The same character is in both paintings. Both paintings were created around the same period.

The Virgin Mary and Apostles sit to the right of the Roman soldier. A unique building also lies behind the Roman soldier. In the Damaskinos parts of the painting were lost with time. Luckily, Philotheos Skoufos painted an identical version during the 1600s. There was also a city in the background. At the top of the painting, Jesus lies waiting for his disciple. He holds a book in his left hand representing the new testament. Angles are dispatched to go collect Saint Stephen the protomartyr.

== Notable copies ==
There are four remaining works that are very similar to the original created between 1640 and 1707. The works were finished by three famous Greek painters. Philotheos Skoufos finished two versions of the original between 1640 and 1685. One of his versions is in good condition it is located at the Metsovo Folk Art Museum in Metsovo, Ioannina, Greece. The second version is slightly damaged it is located in the Byzantine Museum of Antivouniotissa in Corfu. It is on the same island as the original. Victor finished a copy of the work around the same period as Skoufos. The painting is housed at the Byzantine and Christian Museum. The final version is part of the Kalliga Collection in Greece. The icon was completed by Stephanos Tzangarolas in 1707.

== Gallery ==
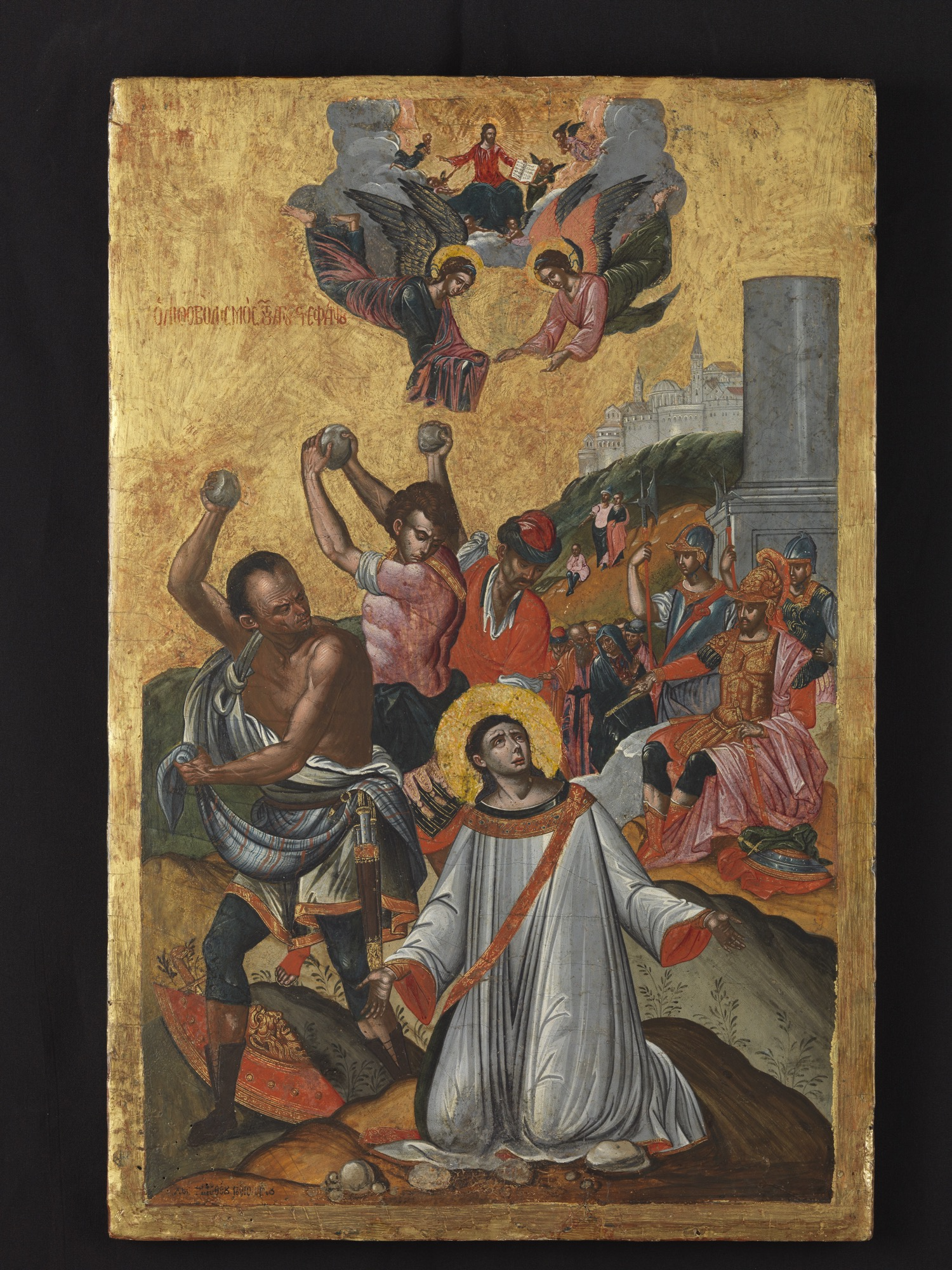
Stoning of Stefano Skoufos

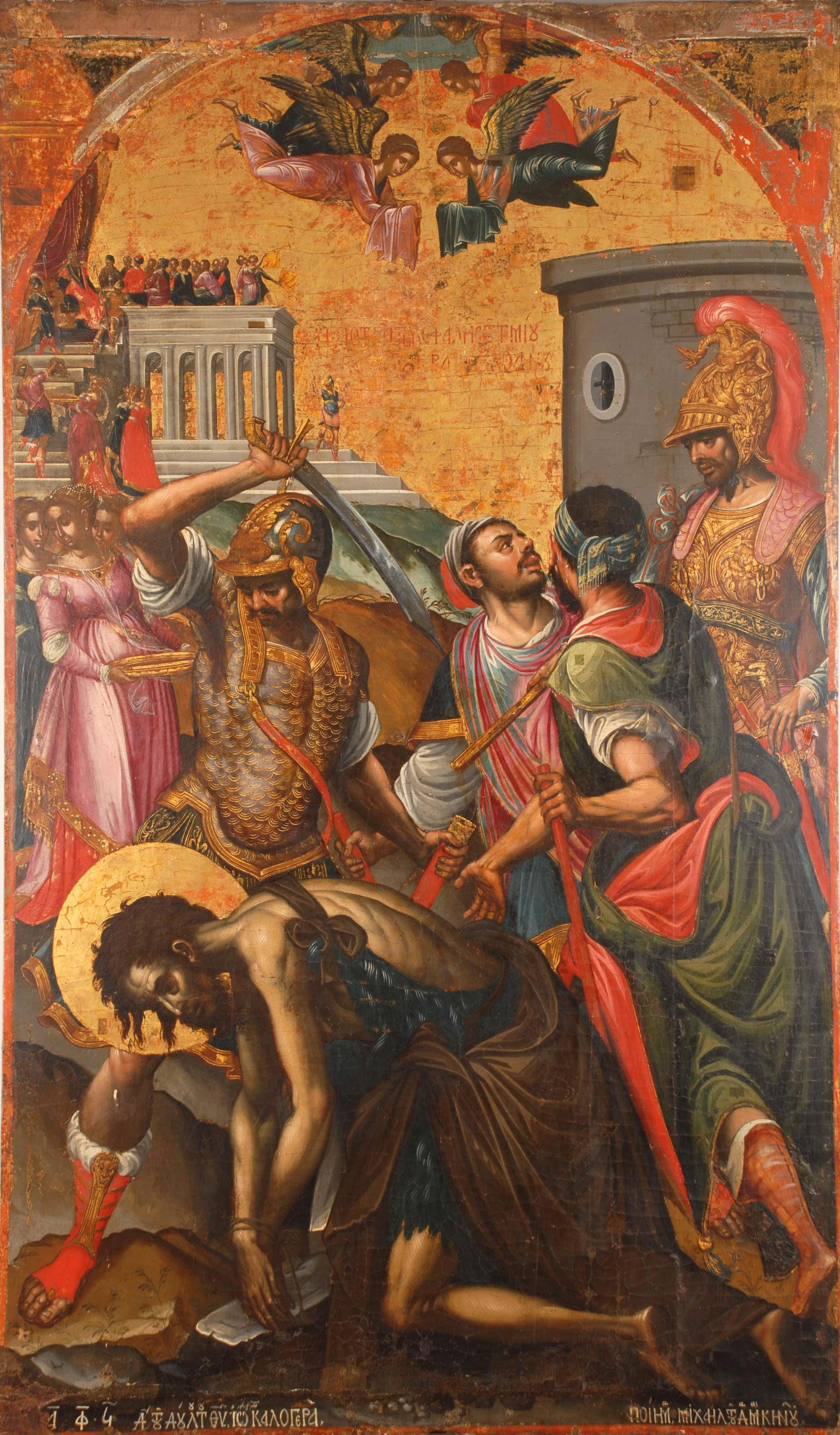
Beheading of John the Baptist

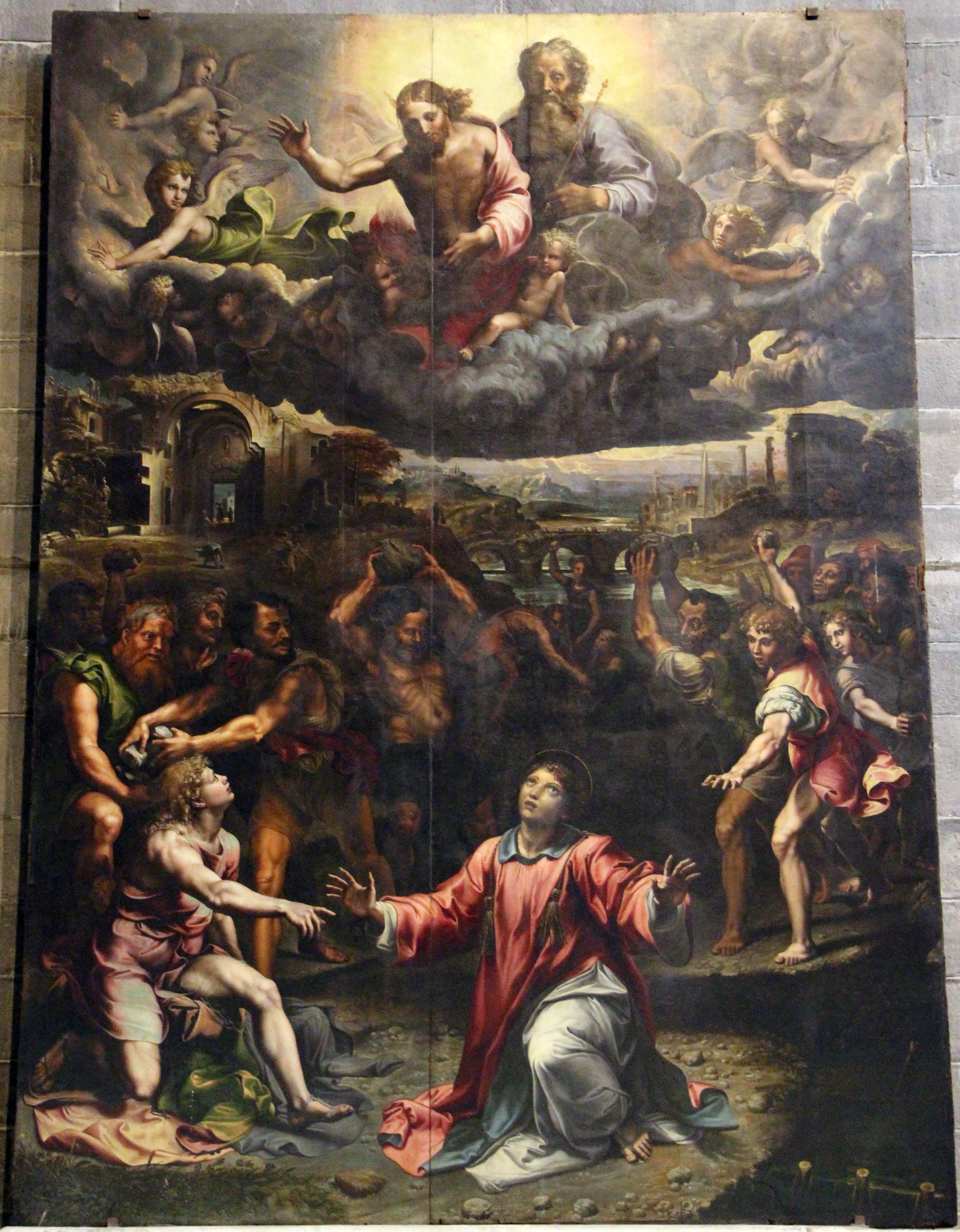
Stoning of Stefano (Romano)

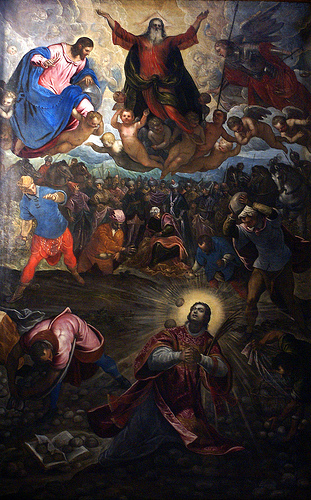
Stoning of Stefano Tintoretto
