= Asia-Europe Museum Network =

International cross-cultural network of museums

The Asia-Europe Museum Network (ASEMUS) is an international cross-cultural network of museums. The museums in the ASEMUS network are located in Europe and Asia in those countries belonging to ASEM, a forum for dialogue between Europe and Asia sponsored by the European Commission. ASEMUS has two key aims: (a) to promote wider mutual understanding between the peoples of Asia and Europe by means of collaborative programmes of museum-based cultural activity and (b) to stimulate and facilitate the sharing, use and knowledge of museum collections of mutual interest.

== Structure ==
ASEMUS membership is by invitation and open to: (a) all relevant museums of the ASEM countries which meet the ICOM definition of a museum (b) other institutions which are registered or registrable as museums within the ICOM definition by the appropriate national authority, and (c) academic departments in third level educational institutions throughout the ASEM countries which teach museum and heritage studies.

== Funding ==
ASEMUS is the offspring of the ASEF structure and because its funding depends on ASEF, its remit is therefore confined to ASEM countries. ASEF is funded by voluntary contributions from its partner governments and shares the financing of its projects with its civil society partners across Asia and Europe.

== Executive committee ==
- Corazon Alvina, Director of the National Museum of the Philippines, Manila, The Philippines
- Stéphane Martin, Director of Musée du Quai Branly, Paris, France (Chair)
- Michael D. Willis, Curator, Department of Asia, British Museum, London (Deputy Chair)
- Ms. Sabina Santaroasa, Director, Cultural Exchange, Asia-Europe Foundation (ASEF) Singapore
- Chong Phil Choe, Director of the University Museum, Sejong University, Seoul, Korea (Vice-Chair)
- Chen Xiejun, Director, Shanghai Museum, Shanghai, China
- Claudius Müller, Director, Museum Five Continents, Munich, Germany
- Sanne Houby-Nielsen, Director General, Museum of World Culture, Gothenburg, Sweden
- Alan Chong, Asian Civilizations Museum, Singapore
- Jonathan King, Keeper of Anthropology, The British Museum, London, United Kingdom
- Steven Engelsman, Director of the National Museum of Ethnology, Leiden, The Netherlands
- Michael Ryan, Director, Chester Beatty Library, Dublin, Ireland
- Karl Magnusson, International Cooperation Manager, Museum of World Culture, Sweden (Secretary)

== Member institutions ==
- Asian Civilisations Museum
- British Museum
- Chester Beatty Library
- Museum der Völker
- Museum Five Continents
- Museum of Asian Art of Corfu
- Museum of World Culture
- National Museum of Ethnology (Netherlands)
- National Museum of Fine Arts (Manila)
- Musée du quai Branly – Jacques Chirac
- Shanghai Museum
