= Museum of Asian Art of Corfu =

Museum in Corfu, Greece

Coordinates: 39°37′33″N 19°55′29″E

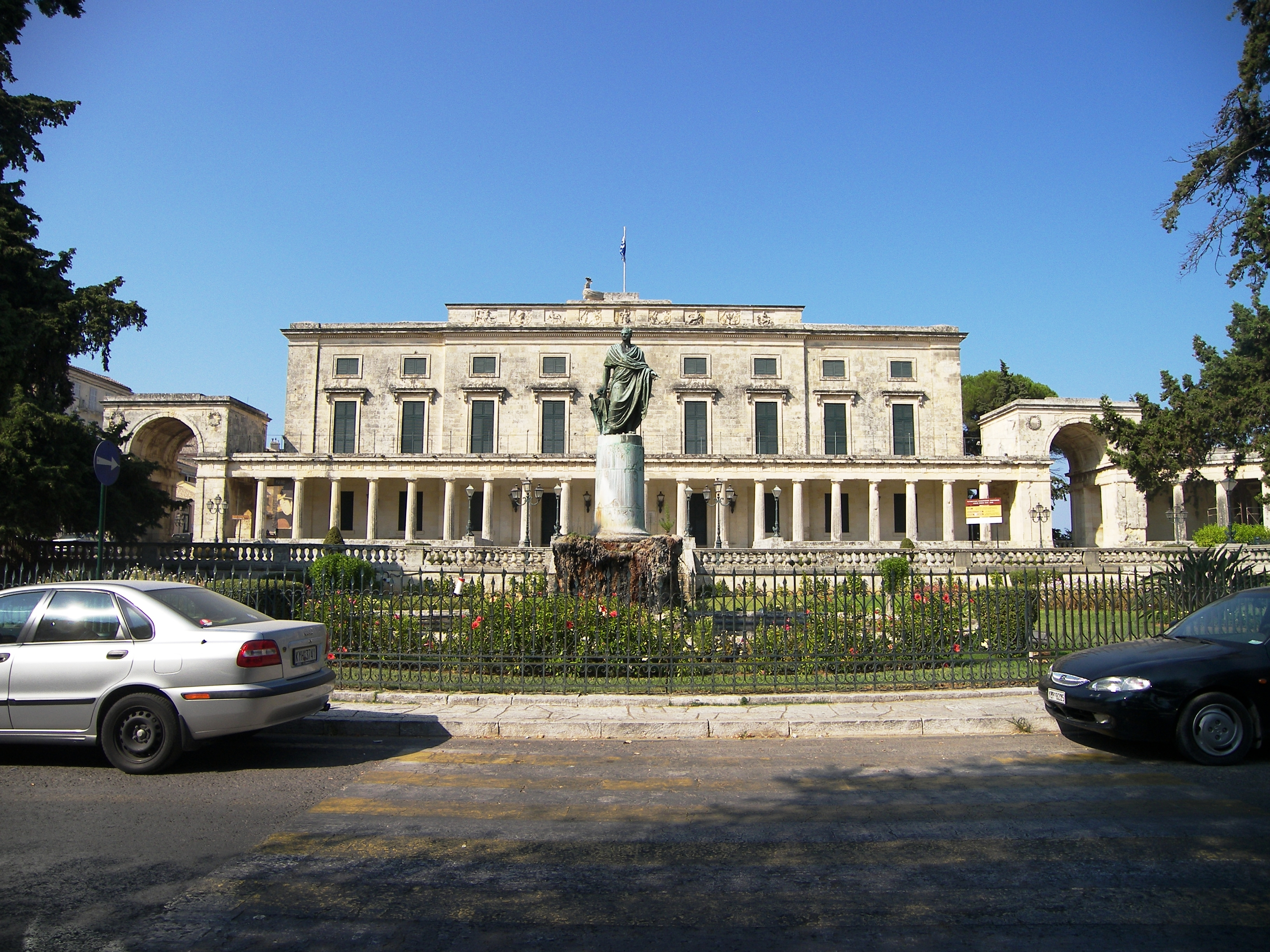
The Palace of St. Michael and St. George, which hosts the museum

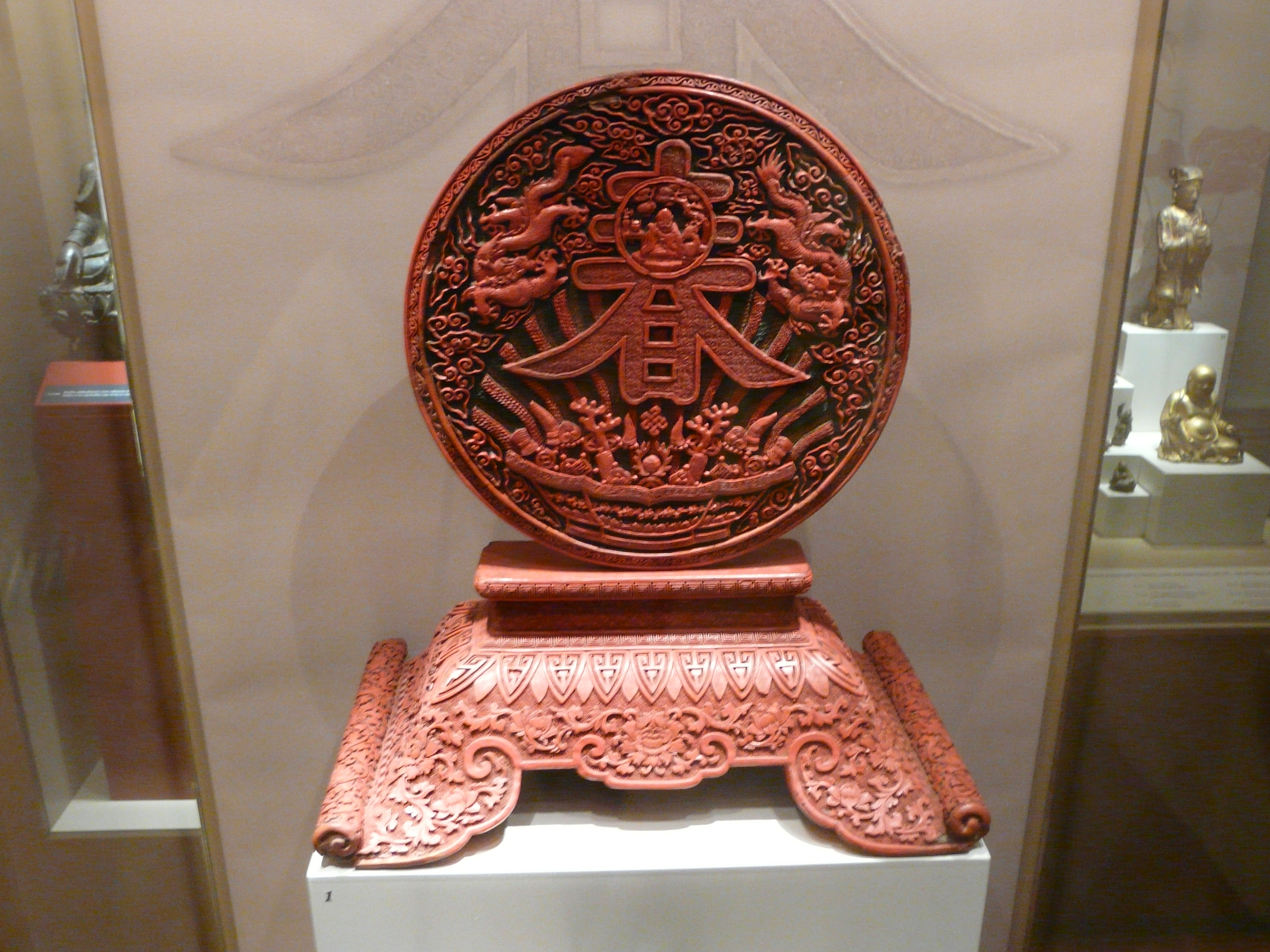
Ritual disc on a base, Beijing-red lacquer. Relief décor and the ideogram of spring on a green background, 17th-19th century.

The Museum of Asian Art of Corfu (Greek: Μουσείο Ασιατικής Τέχνης Κέρκυρας) is a museum in the Palace of St. Michael and St. George in Corfu, Greece. The only museum in Greece dedicated to the art of Asia, it has collections of Chinese art, Japanese art, Indian art and others.

== History ==
The museum opened in 1927 as the Museum of Sino-Japanese Art with the donation of the Gregorios Manos collection. A Greek ambassador to Austria, Manos (1850–1928) had purchased approximately 9,500 Chinese, Korean and Japanese artefacts at art auctions in Vienna and Paris in the late 19th and early 20th century. He compiled, recorded and catalogued his collection himself, with nearly scientific consistency, and is regarded as the first Greek authority on Far Eastern art. In 1919, he donated his collection to the Greek State, on the condition that a Sino-Japanese art museum be opened in Corfu.

The second donation was the collection of N. Chatzivasileiou, the former Greek ambassador to India and Japan, with artefacts from India, Pakistan, Tibet, Siam and Northeast Asia. This donation changed the previously mainly Sino-Japanese focus of the museum, resulting in its renaming into Museum of Asian Art. The third major donation was from Ch. Chiotakis, a Greek merchant in the Netherlands. Smaller noteworthy donations came from Petros Almanachos, Iordanis Siniosoglou and Giannis Kollas.

== Museum ==
The collection contains some eleven thousand objects, the oldest from the 11th century BC. Artistic collections include Japanese printed pictures, Chinese porcelain, and Indian sculptures in bronze and other materials plus wood carvings. Some of the wood and bronze items are of superb quality and depict gods and goddesses engaged in erotic scenes. The museum is set in the well-preserved rooms of the Palace of St. Michael and St. George, built during the British rule, with ornate furniture and decorations from that period.

Administratively, the museum is a Special Regional Service of the Ministry of Culture, with the aim of researching and protecting the cultural heritage of Asia and promote it in Greece and Europe. It is a member of the Asia-Europe Museum Network. The museum has a number of postcards on sale plus a book of Chinese pottery in the collection as well as an overall guide that omits the major Indian works of art on display.
