= George Whitmore (British Army officer) =

British Army general (1775–1862)

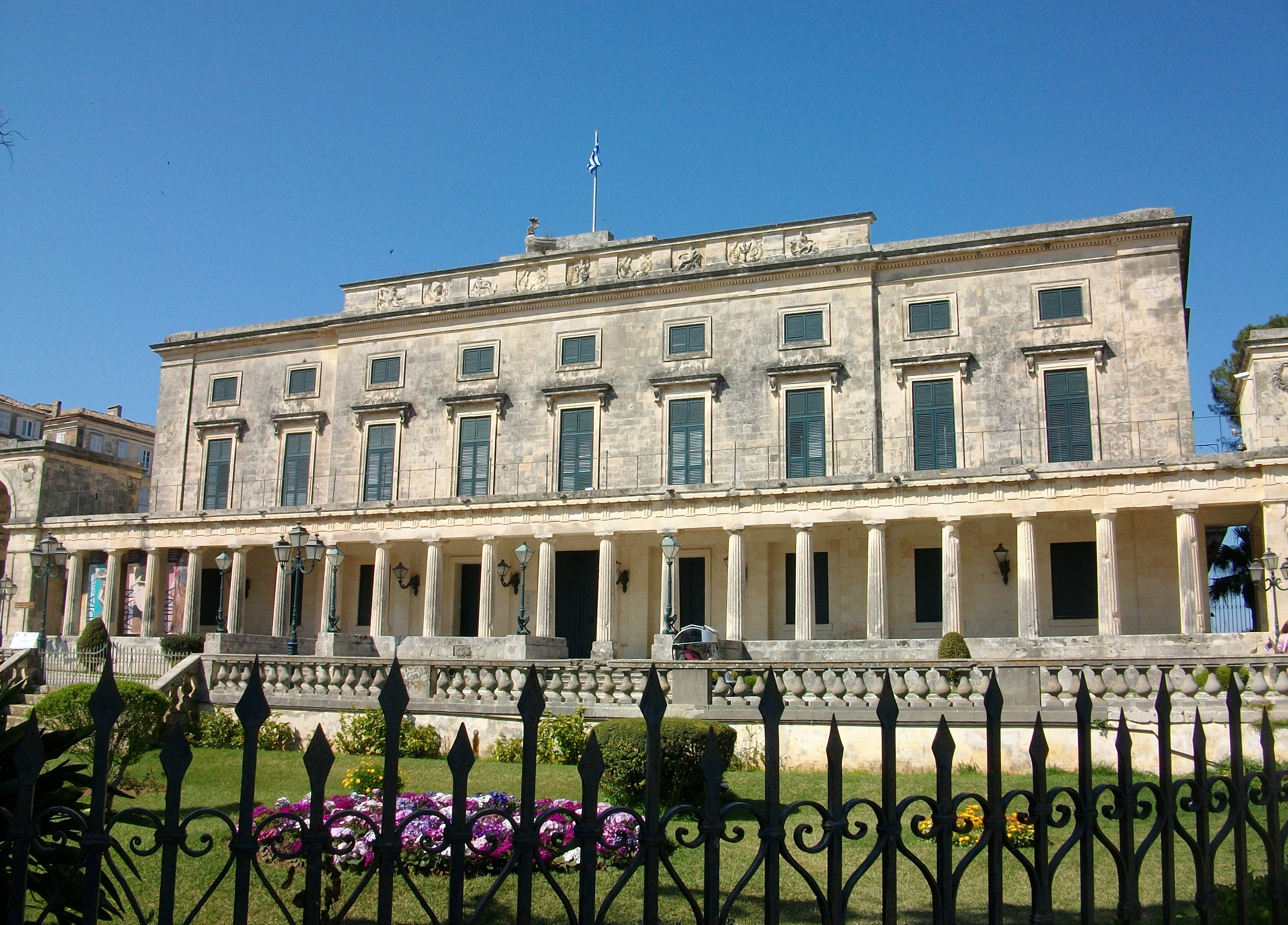
The Palace of St. Michael and St. George (1819–24) in Corfu

Sir George Whitmore KCH (12 May 1775, Lower Slaughter – 19 November 1862, Amiens) was a British Army officer.

== Life ==
He was the son of George Whitmore (1739–1794) and Mary Walls (1744 – 11 March 1808). He entered Woolwich Academy at the age of 14, and had an army commission at age 18.

Whitmore headed the Royal Engineers detachment on Malta as its Colonel Commandant between 1811 and 1829. There he became a great friend of the governor Sir Thomas Maitland and designed the military hospital at the Villa Bighi in conjunction with Vice Admiral Sir Pulteney Malcolm. When Sir Thomas Maitland was high commissioner of the Ionian Islands, he designed the Palace of St. Michael and St. George in Corfu City. He later became a major general and was lieutenant-governor of the Woolwich Academy between 1840 and 1846.

== Family ==
Whitmore married Cordelia Ainslie (1780 – 19 December 1857) on 16 January 1798. Their second daughter Cordelia Winifreda married Captain Montagu Stopford, RN, on 25 August 1827. Their grandson, Sir George Stoddart Whitmore (1829–1903), was born on Malta to Lieutenant (later Major) George St Vincent Whitmore RE and to the chief justice of Malta, Sir John Stoddart's, daughter. He later became an army officer and police officer in New Zealand.

== Works ==
- The General: Travel Memoirs
