= Museum der Völker =

Museum in Austria

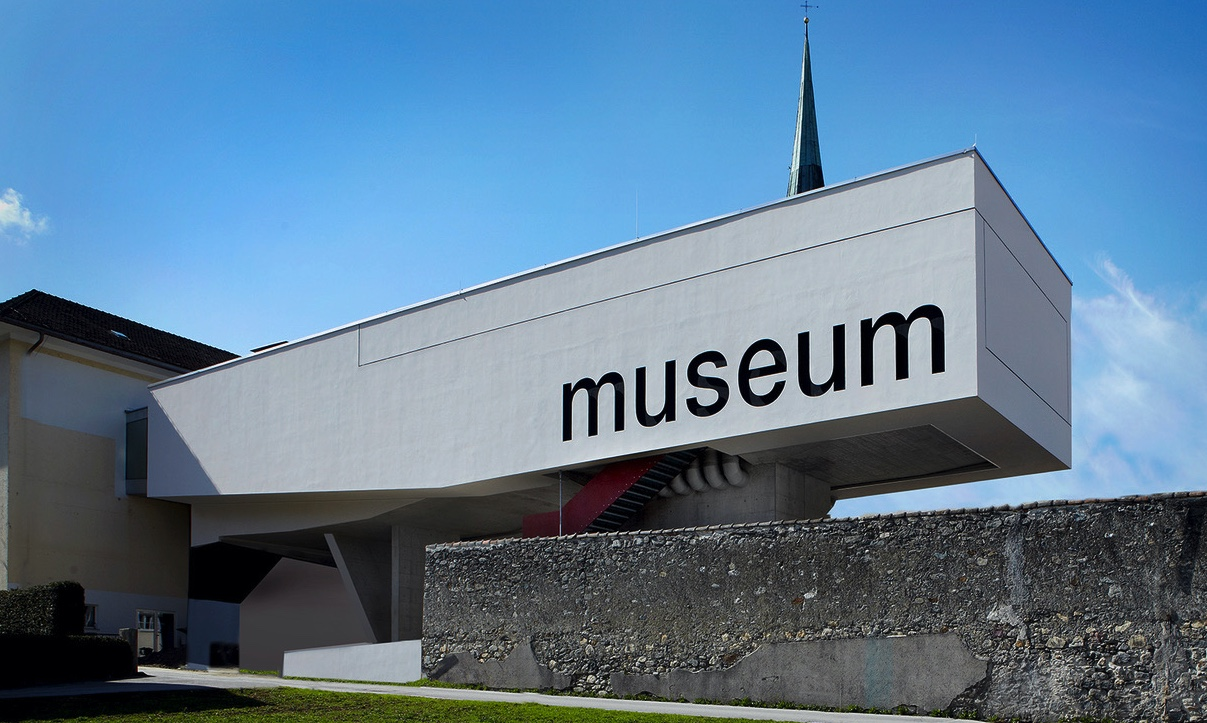
Museum der Völker

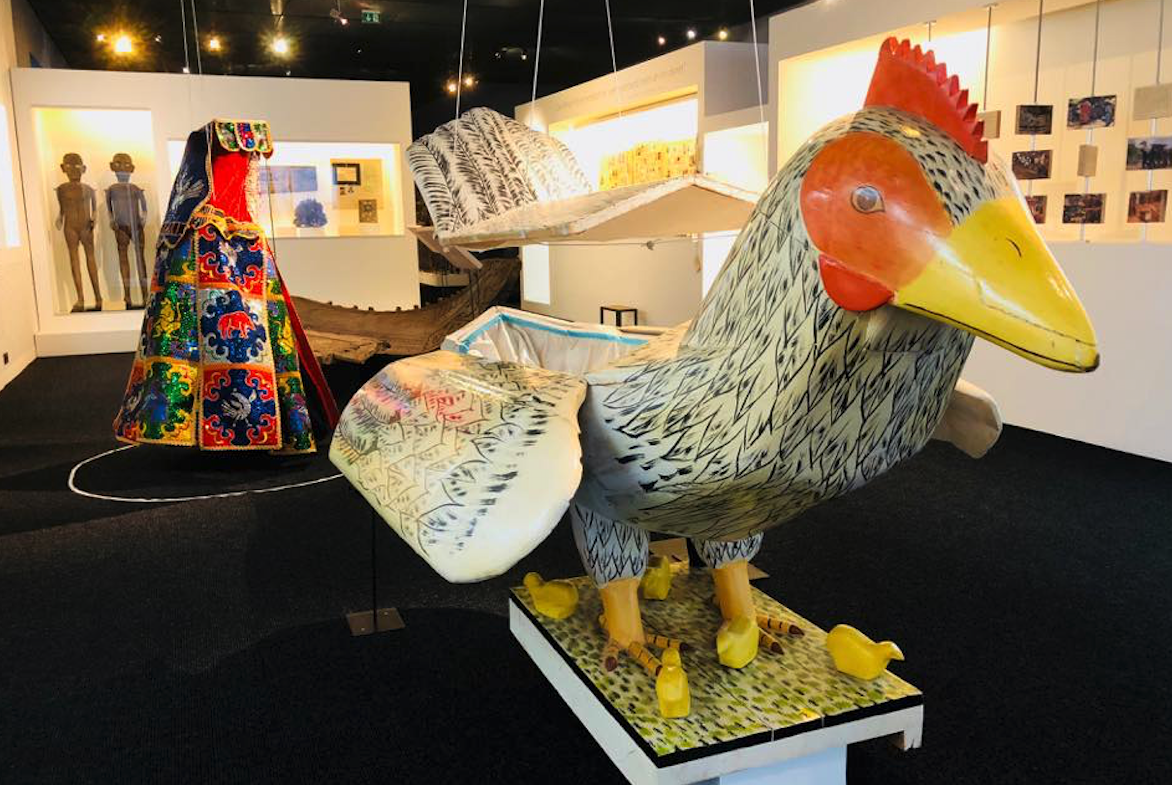
Exhibition "Unvergessen machen"

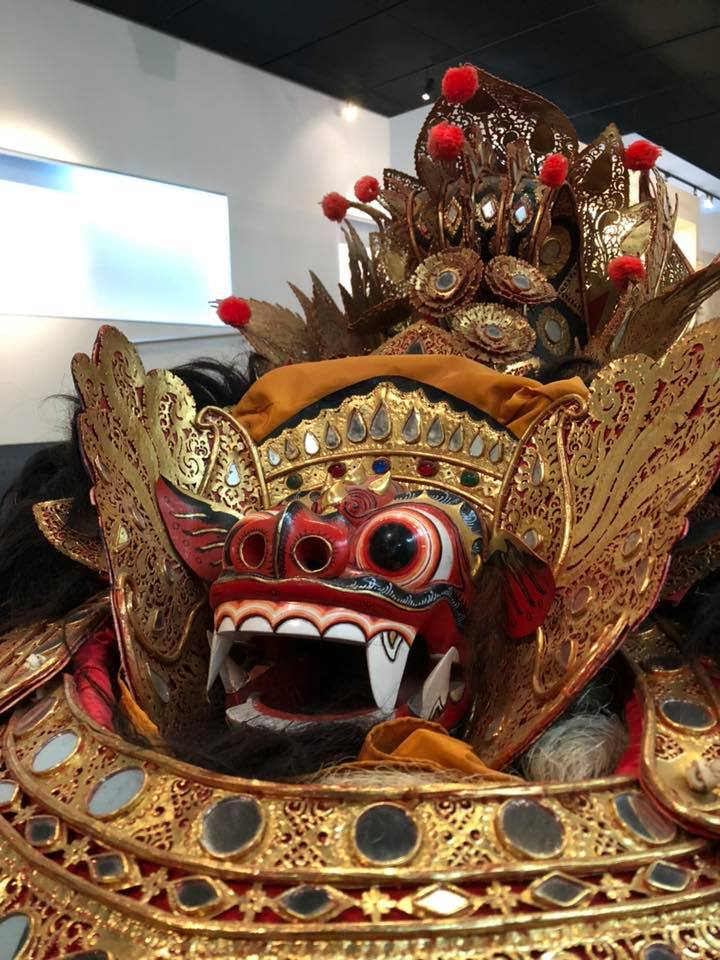
Barong, Bali, Indonesia

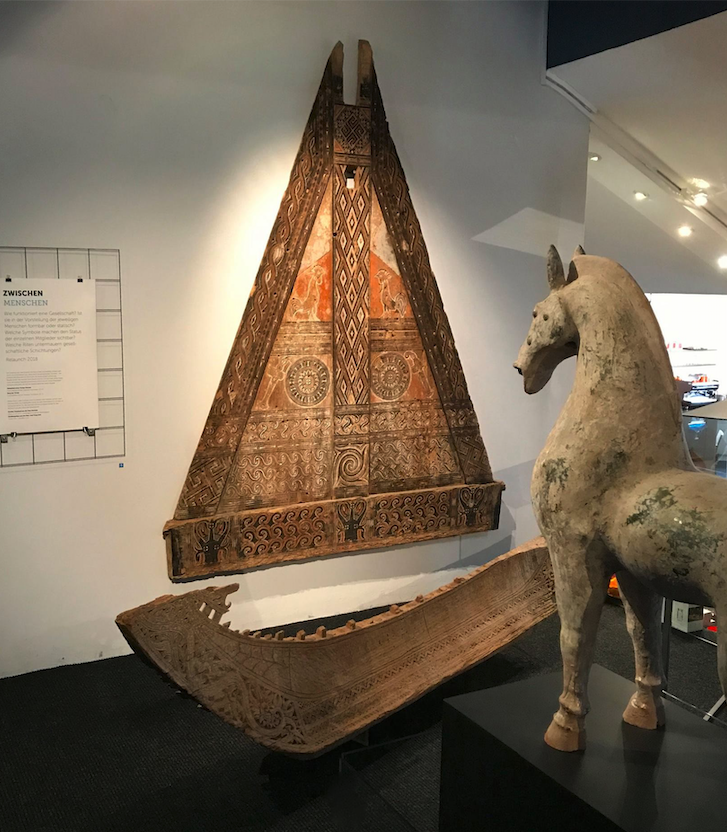
part of an Toraja house, Sulawesi and a clay horse from the Han-period, China, 2. century BC

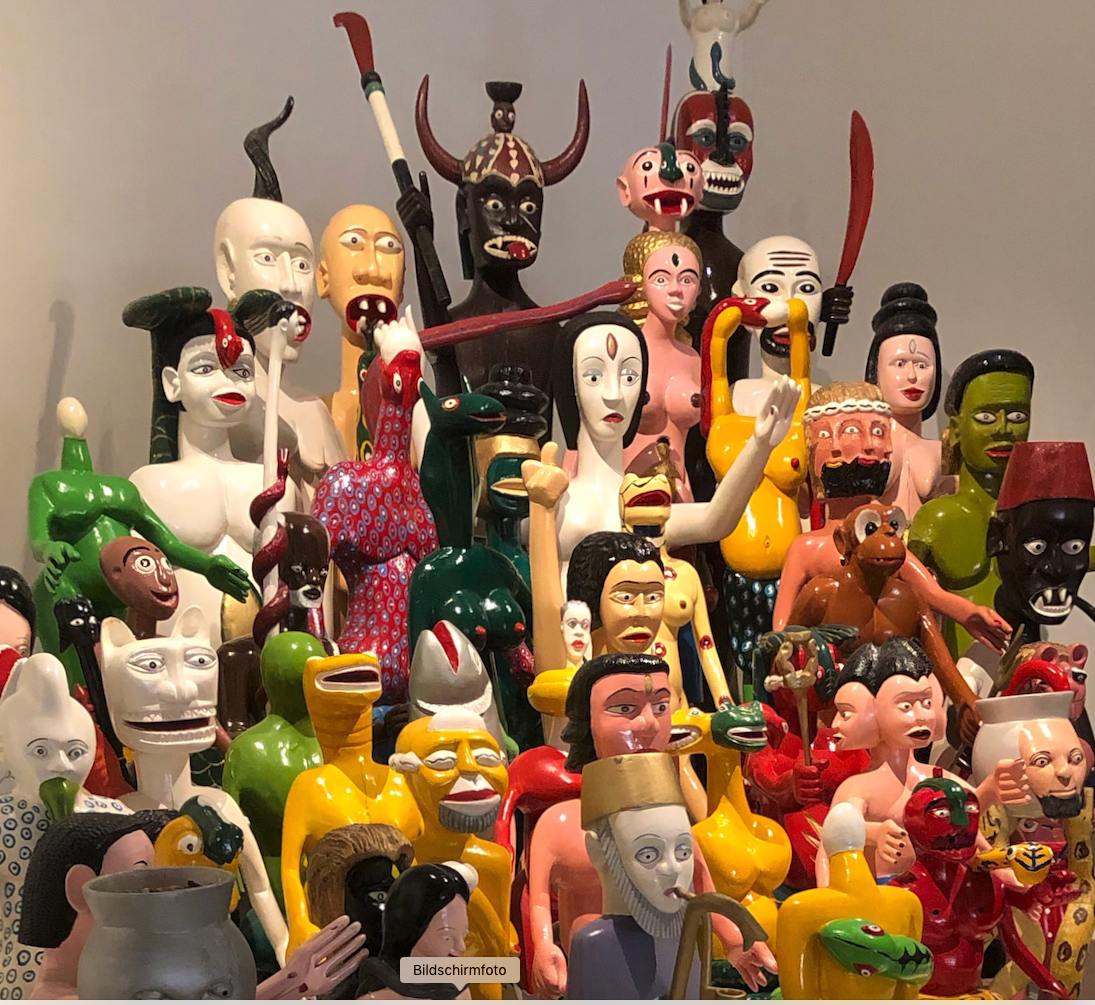
Voodoo, Museum der Völker

The Museum der Völker in the Austrian Schwaz in the county of Tyrol was founded in 1995 as a cultural association Haus der Völker by Gert Chesi and belongs to the well known Ethnology museums in Europe. After a new construction and remodeling the exhibition operation opened on the 12th of April 2013 as Museum der Völker. Translated the name means museum of the peoples or museum of the tribes.

== History ==
Gert Chesi, photographer, journalist and author, had collected more than a thousand exhibits from all over the world in the period of fifty years. The art objects are the base of the Museum operation and give an insight into the religious and artistic creation of mankind. In recent years, the museum underwent a complete redesign. Today, it features new building sections and an integrated studio gallery. The museum spans three levels with distinct exhibition themes: the permanent exhibition "Between Heaven and Earth" on the ground floor, and special exhibitions on the first and second floors.

== Cultural Club ==
Today the cultural club Museum der Völker runs the museum. Art objects from distant cultures determine the Museum: Stone sculptures of Khmer, Buddha images from many eras, terracotta figures of the Nok, ancestral figures of the Dajak, grave finds from China and old bronzes from South-East Asia are displayed in addition to contemporary Voodoo objects and utensils of animism.

== Exhibitions ==
Artifacts from over a period of four thousand years ethnographic exhibits from four themes will be presented to the public:

- Africa
- Asia
- Archaeology
- Afro-American syncretism

== Collections ==
In 2020, the museum celebrated its 25th anniversary, as well as its founder Gert Chesi's 80th birthday by a special exhibition.

Another special exhibition is about Ethiopia and a local medical doctor who worked there in the 1950s and very early 1960s. A permanent exhibition is about Asian religions and its interest to the western world.

- 2010 Schätze aus dem Depot
- 2010: Textile Kunst aus Afrika
- 2010: Das Erbe Chinas
- 2011 Feuer und Erz – Schmiede und Gießer in Afrika
- 2011: Afrikas Moderne im Spiegel der Generationen
- 2011: Wohnen mit den Ahnen
- 2011: Jubiläumsausstellung 15 Jahre Haus der Völker
- 2012: Magische Stoffe – gewobene Träume – Kunstvolle Textilien aus Indonesien
- 2013: Sangomas – Traditionelle Heiler Südafrikas, Fotografien von Peter Frank
- 2013: Geistermasken aus Thailand
- 2013: AFRIKA HEUTE!
- 2014: Söhne und Töchter des Windes – Die letzten Nomaden Afrikas, Fotografien von Mario Gerth
- 2014: Kunst und Magie in Silber und Seide – Schmuck und Textilien chinesischer Bergvölker
- 2014: Dogon, Kunst und Mythos in Zusammenarbeit mit Jan Baptist Bedaux
- 2015: Tanzende Schatten - Marionetten, Puppen und Masken aus Asien
- 2015: Burma - Meisterwerke des Buddhismus
- 2015: Susanne Wenger - Ein Leben mit den Götterm
- Exhibition Between Heaven and Earth
  2015: Zauber der Weltkulturen 20 Jahre Museum der Völker
- 2015: Das Gedächtnis der Steine - Seltene Steinreliefs und Figuren aus Asien
- 2016: Das Böse - Exponate aus Schwarzmagischen Kreisen
- 2016: Yoruba - Meisterwerke einer Afrikanischen Hochkultur, Samstag
- 2016: GLADYS - Der Maler und seine Geister - Zeitgenössische Malerei aus Benin
- 2016: DAS GEHEIME KAMERUN - Fotografien von Henning Christoph
- 2016: AFRIKA IM GEWAND - Bunte Textilvielfalt eines Kontinents
- 2016/2017: "Indonesien – Kunst und Kult vom Inselreich"
- 2016/2017: "Bali – Insel der Götter"
- 09.09.2017 - 11.03.2018: Leon Pollux "Menschen"
- 09.09.2017 - 18.11.2018: "Zwischen Eigensinn & Anpassung"
- 17.03.2018 - 2019: "Unvergessen machen"
- 05.05.2018 - 18.11.2018: "Maasai – Baumeisterinnen aus Ololosokwan"
- 22.06.2018 - 18.11.2018: Schulprojekt und Ausstellung "Mein, dein, unser Raum"
- 08.12.2018 - 18.08.2019: "UNGEHEUER WILD"
- 2019 "Zwischen Himmel und Erde"
- 2019 "Richtig guter Stoff"
- 2020 "Erinnerungen an Äthiopien"
- 2020 Anniversary Exhibition
- 2021 "Weltbilder erzählen" - Re-thinking Earth
- 2021 "Sagenhaft" Legendary - Bathic by Rosemarie Sternagl l

== Documentary Film ==
please refer Gert Chesi

== Decoration ==
1999, the Museum der Völker received the Tyrolean Museum prize

1999 Recognition Award of the Austrian Federal Ministry for Arts and Culture

2014 ICOM Austria, Österreichisches Museumsgütesiegel
