= Philotheos Skoufos =

Greek painter and clergyman

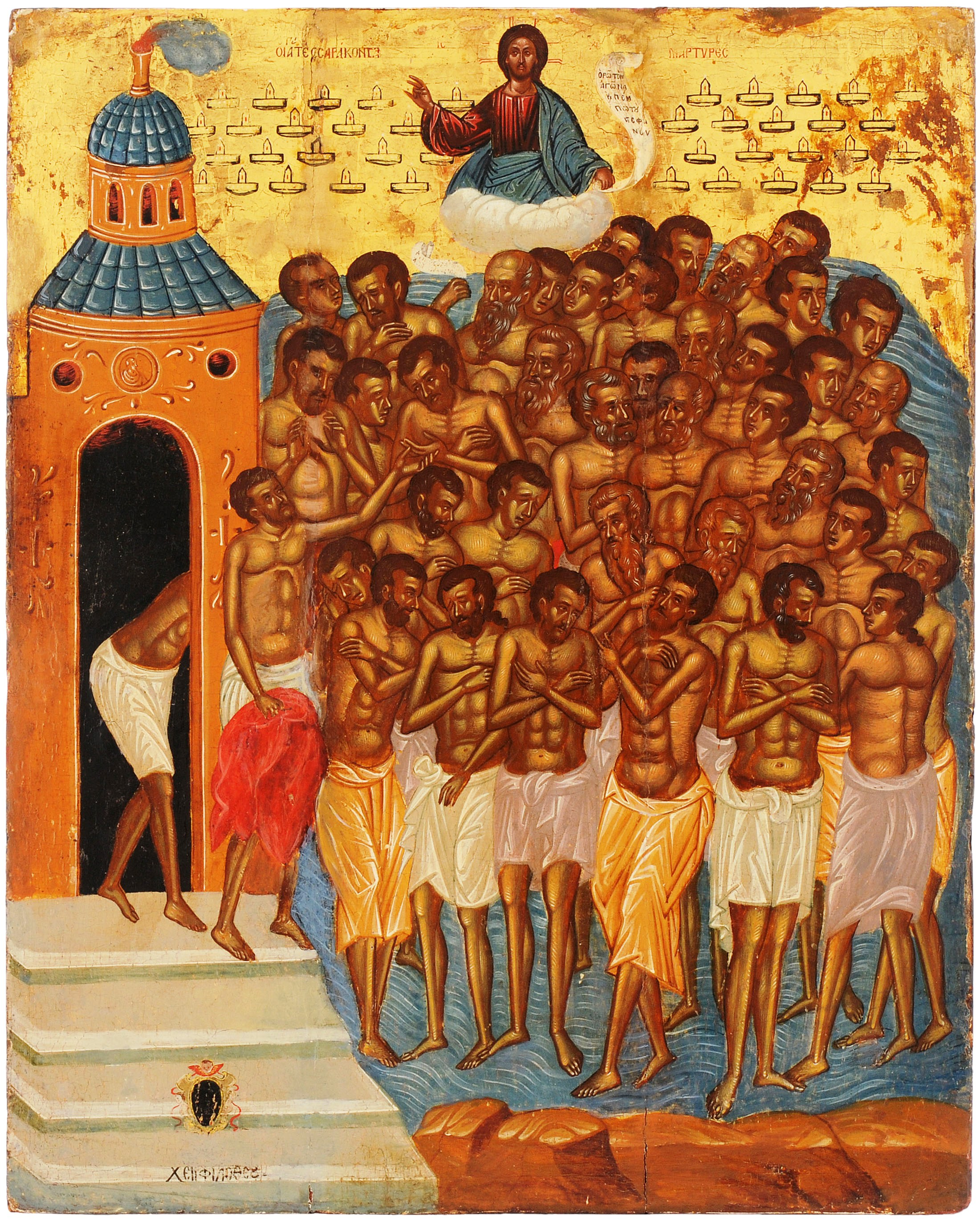
- 40 Martyrs
- Born: Between 1615 and 1625; Chania, Crete
- Died: 1685; Zakynthos
- Movement: Cretan School, Heptanese School
- Occupations: Painter, Monk
- Years active: 1640-1685
- Era: 17th Century
- Style: Maniera Greca

Philotheos Skoufos (also Filotheos; Greek: Φιλόθεος Σκούφος; between 1615 and 1625 – 1685) was a Greek painter, educator and clergyman during the 17th century. He collaborated with Emmanuel Tzanes on several pieces while he was in Corfu. Philotheos was a member of the Cretan School and Heptanese School. His work was influenced by the Venetian school. He was briefly affiliated with the famous Greek church in Venice San Giorgio dei Greci. Emmanuel Tzanes and Konstantinos Tzanes were also in Venice around the same period and affiliated with San Giorgio dei Greci. He was the priest who presided over famous painter Ioannis Moskos's wedding. Philotheos was active on the Ionian Island while Theodore Poulakis and Elias Moskos also had active workshops. Skoufos most popular works were the Stoning of St Stephen and the Virgin in the Temple.

== History ==
Skoufos was born on the island of Crete. He was a monk at the Chryssopigi Monastery Crete. While he was in Crete he learned painting. The Cretan War (1645–1669) broke out. He fled to Souda. He later joined 34 monks in the military branch of Saint Basil's. He bravely fought for the Venetian Empire under General Andrea Cornora. He spied on the enemy and assisted the Archbishop of Philadelphia Athanasios Valeriano. The monks helped arm the locals to resist the oncoming invasion. Skoufos fled to the Ionian Islands and awaited permission to travel to Venice.

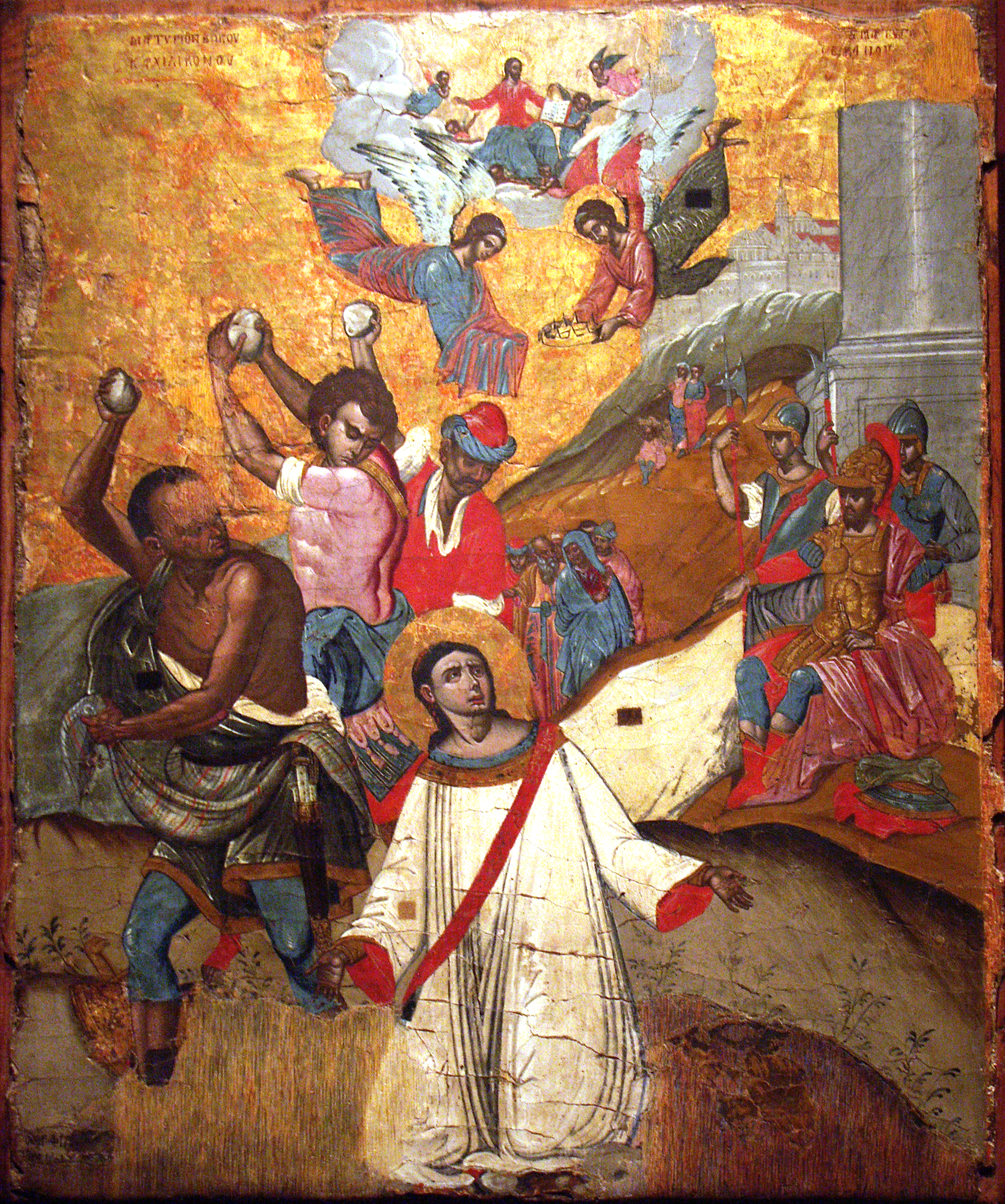
The Stoning of Saint Steven

While Skoufos was on the island of Corfu he painted with Tzanes. He briefly was a monk at the Monastery of Saint Paraskevi. He was in Venice by 1653 as a teacher at the Scuola dei Greci. He stayed in this position for two years. He was temporarily the pastor of San Giorgio dei Greci. He married 13 people between 1655 and 1658. He was not permanently elected to the position. In 1660, Emmanuel Tzanes became the parish priest of the Greek Orthodox Church San Giorgio Dei Greco replacing Skoufos. Skoufos stayed in Venice for another five years. While he was in Venice he complained about living in poverty and wanted to go to the Ionian Islands. He wanted his own church. By 1665, the Venetian State granted him the monastery of Panagia Laurentaina on the island of Zakynthos. Painter Elias Moskos had an active workshop on the same island.

Skoufos stayed on the island for the rest of his life. According to records in 1670 the church was in poor condition. Skoufos worked hard to renovate it. He painted many parts of the church. He requested permission to leave the church to his nephew Parthenios Skoufos. Around this time he also taught painting. He signed a four-year contract with the father of Nicoletos Gropas. He taught his son painting and made him a priest. Philotheos continued to decorate the church of Laurentaina. By 1673, his nephew Parthenios took over the Monastery at Laurentaina. He also gave his nieces his property on the island of Zakynthos. He retired at the monastery of Agios Athanasios of Kipi. He died on March 9, 1685.

Skoufos adopted a unique artistic style and characteristic. The artist utilized three schools the Heptanese School, Cretan School and the Venetian school. Clearly the Forty Holy Martyrs and The Stoning of Saint Steven escape the traditional maniera greca and carry the Cretan School into the Heptanese School which were clearly influenced by the Venetian school. His workshop was on the same island as Elias Moskos and the father of the Heptanese School Theodore Poulakis was on the neighboring island Corfu. Clearly, Skoufos influenced many artists including Emmanuel Tzanes whom he collaborated with on several occasions. Comparing Theodore Poulakis Adam and Eve to Skoufos Forty Holy Martyrs. Both exhibit a sculpture-like realism. The bodies in both paintings are sculptured with clear dimensions. Skoufos technique also has its place in the early formation of the Heptanese School. One artist that Skoufos's work closely resembles is Victor (iconographer).

== Gallery ==
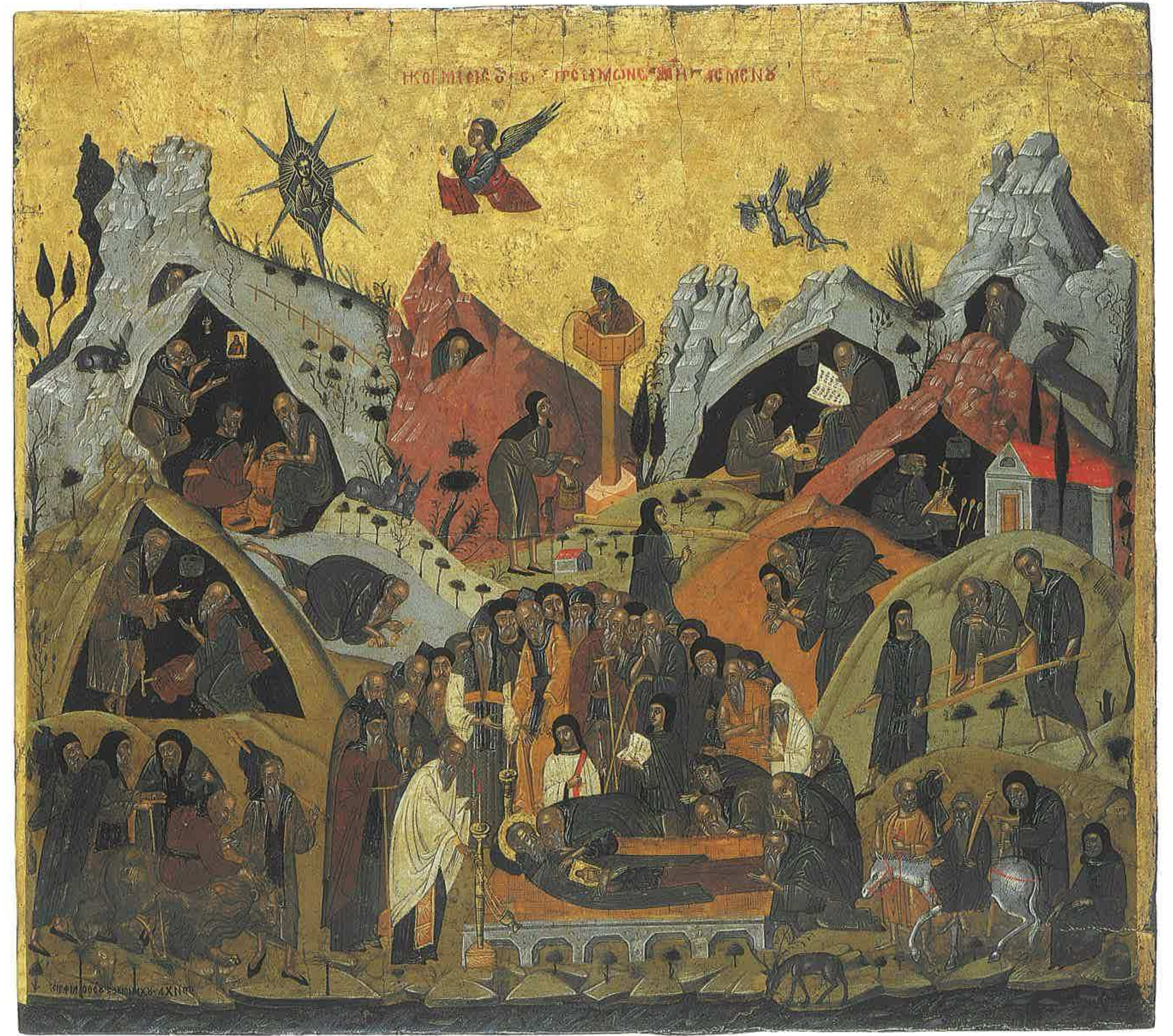
Dormition of Sabbas the Sanctified

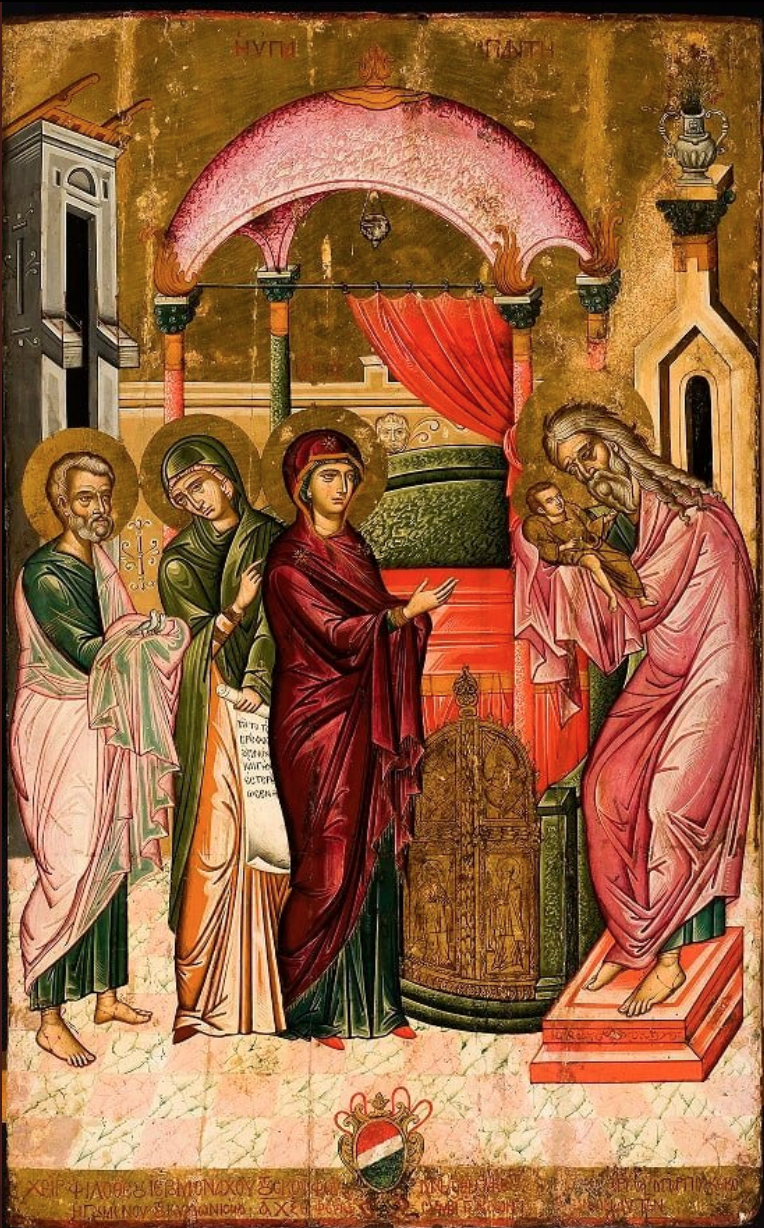
Presentation of Jesus

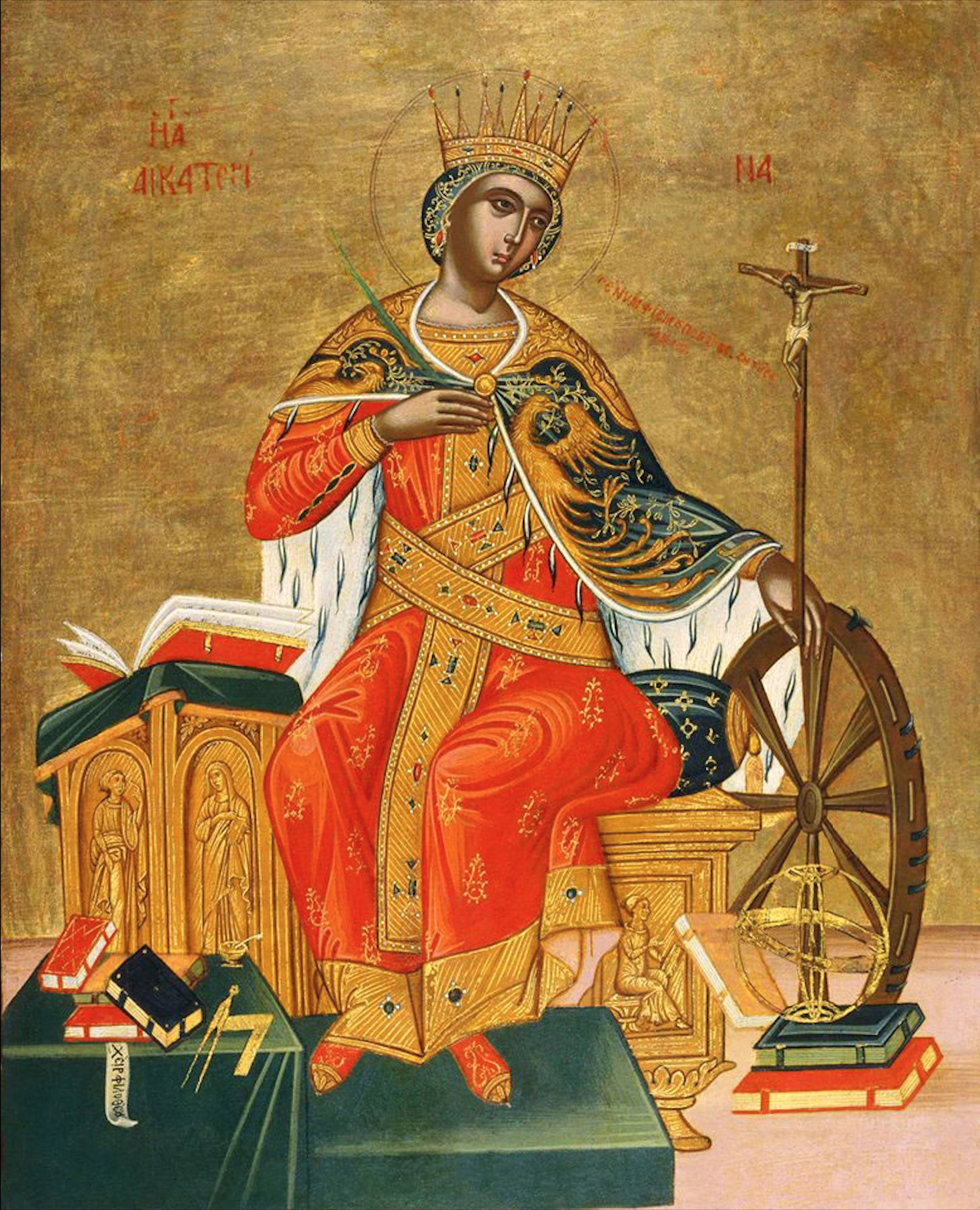
Saint Catherine

== See also ==
- Georgios Klontzas
- Michael Damaskinos
- Ieremias Palladas
- The Stoning of Stephen (Skoufos)
