= Palace of St. Michael and St. George =

- Ανάκτορο των Αγίων Μιχαήλ και Γεωργίου
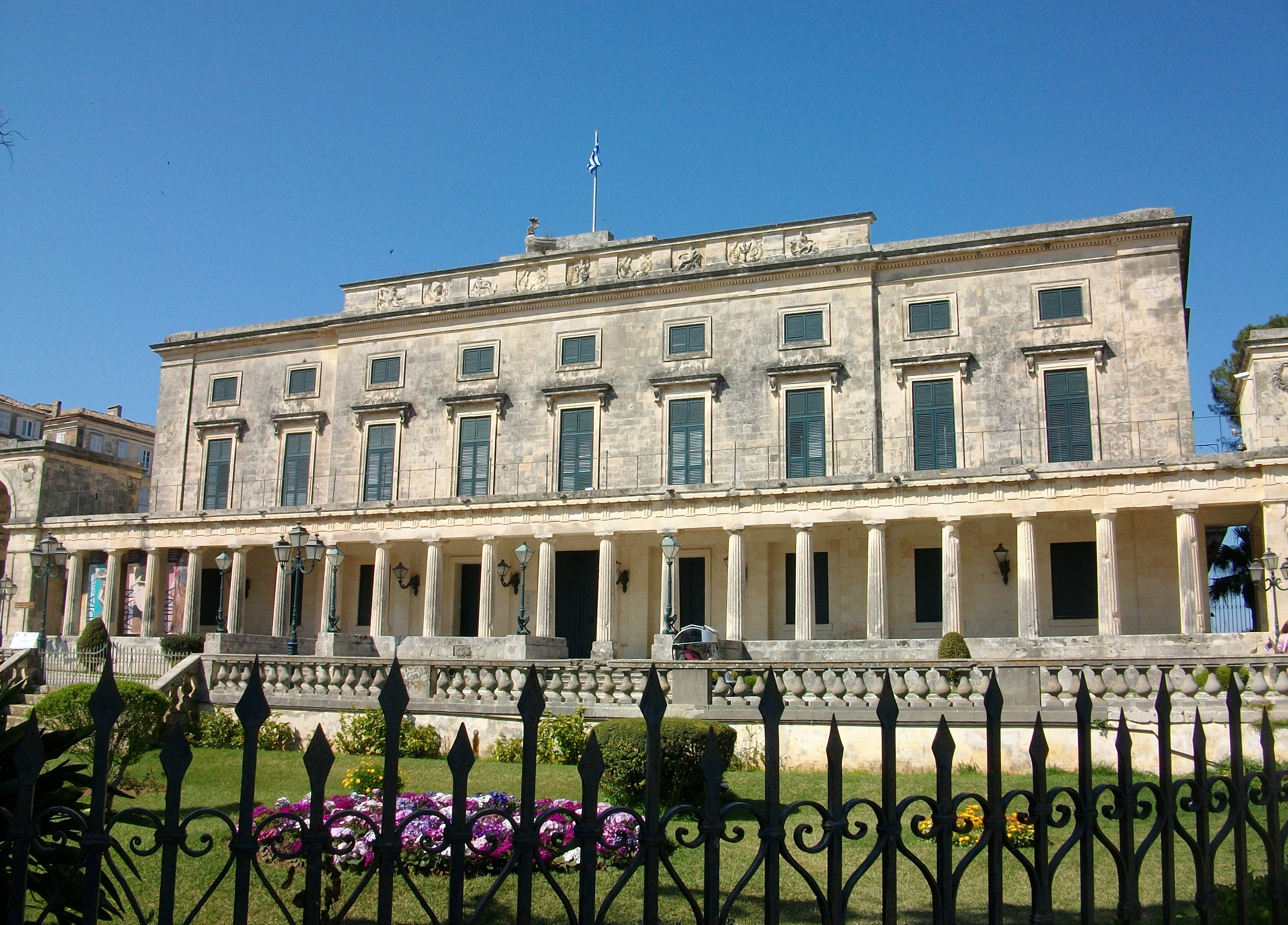
- Façade of the Palace of St. Michael and St. George
- Interactive map of the Palace of St. Michael and St. George area

General information
- Status: Intact
- Type: Palace
- Architectural style: Neoclassical
- Location: Corfu City, Corfu, Greece
- Coordinates: 39°37′33″N 19°55′28.9″E
- Named for: Order of St Michael and St George
- Construction started: 1819
- Completed: 1824

Technical details
- Material: Limestone

Design and construction
- Architect: George Whitmore

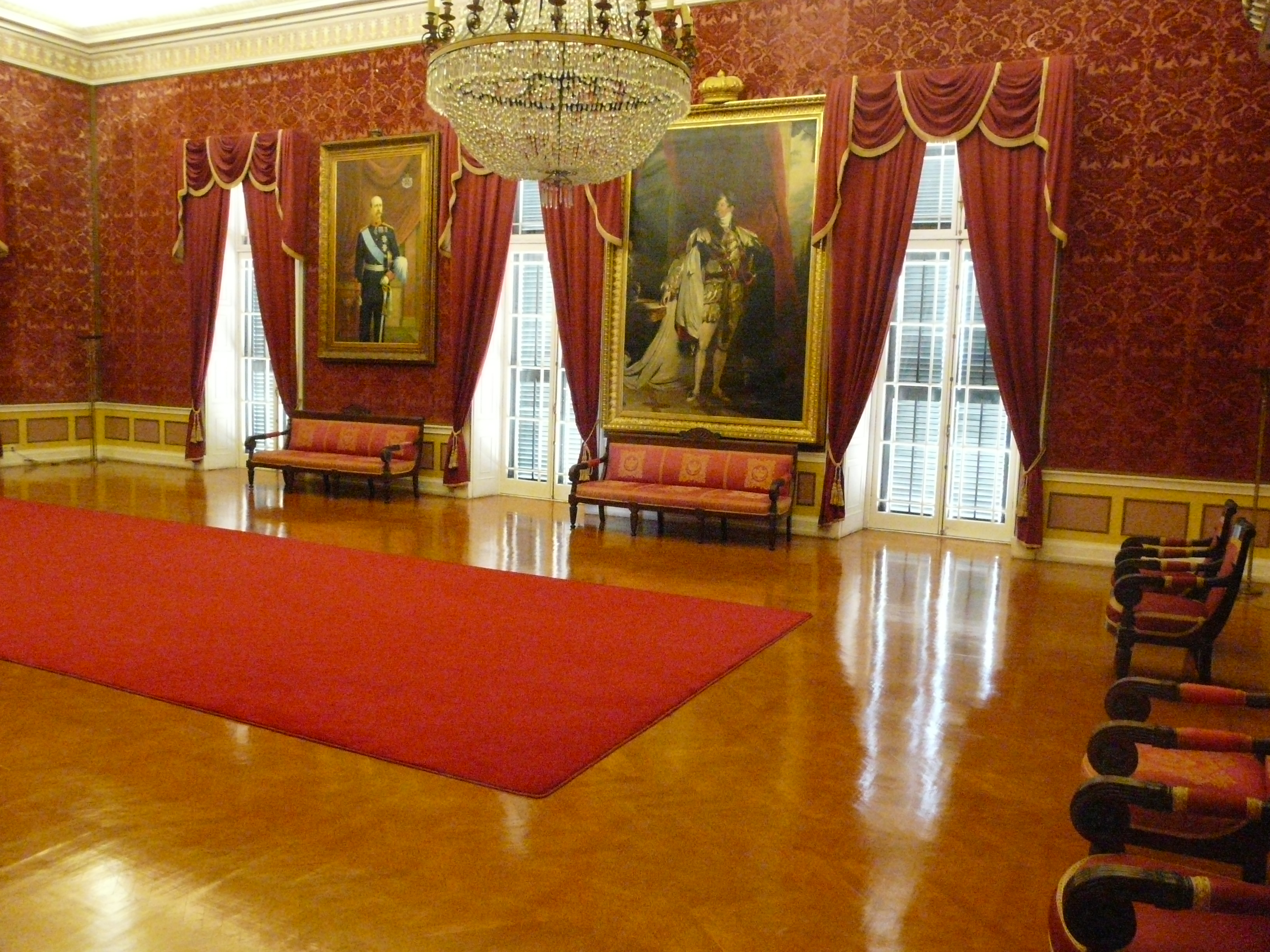
The Throne Room, which contains a copy of Sir Thomas Lawrence's portrait of King George IV of Great Britain and Ireland (the portrait on the right of the above photograph) and the portrait of King George I of Greece (the portrait on the left side).

The Palace of St. Michael and St. George (Greek: Ανάκτορο των Αγίων Μιχαήλ και Γεωργίου) is a palace in Corfu City on the island of Corfu, Greece. Commissioned by Sir Thomas Maitland, it originally served as the residence of the British Lord High Commissioner of the Ionian Islands. It was built between 1819 and 1824, to a neoclassical design of Colonel George Whitmore.

The building is also known as the Royal Palace, the City Palace, or locally by the Greek name Palaia Anaktora (Παλαιά Ανάκτορα; literally "Old Palace").

== History ==
The palace was commissioned by Sir Thomas Maitland, the British Lord High Commissioner of the Ionian Islands. It served as the High Commissioner's residence, but was also the home of the Ionian Senate and the Order of St Michael and St George. The foundation stone was laid on St. George's day in 1819, and it was completed in 1824. The location is between the old town of Corfu and the Venetian-era Old Fortress.

The palace was designed in the Greek Revival style of neoclassical architecture. It was designed by the British architect George Whitmore, who was a colonel and later a major-general in the Royal Engineers. The building primarily consists of limestone imported from Malta, and Maltese workers were employed in its construction. The sculptural elements of the palace are the work of the Maltese sculptors Vincenzo and Ferdinando Dimech, as well as the Corfiot sculptor Pavlos Prosalentis.

After the union of Corfu with the Kingdom of Greece in 1864, the palace served as a royal residence; up to 1967, the Greek king occasionally used the palace on state occasions while in residence at his nearby villa, Mon Repos.

Today the palace houses the Museum of Asian art of Corfu. The collection of the museum started in 1927 and consists mostly of donations, the largest being from Gregorios Manos with 10,500 pieces.

The two gateways which flank the palace are the gate of St. Michael and the gate of St. George. The state rooms consist of a grand staircase, a rotunda in the centre leading to two large rooms, the Throne Room and the state dining room. The palace was renovated for the European Union Summit meeting in 1994.

== Gardens ==
The palace gardens, complete with old Venetian stone aquariums, exotic trees and flowers, overlook the bay through old Venetian fortifications and turrets. The local sea baths are at the foot of the fortifications surrounding the gardens. A café on the grounds includes its own art gallery, with exhibitions of both local and international artists. It is locally known as the Art Café. From the same spot, the viewer can observe ships passing through the narrow channel of the historic Vido island (Βίδο Κέρκυρας) to the north, on their way to Corfu harbour (Νέο Λιμάνι), with high speed retractable aerofoil ferries from Igoumenitsa cutting across the panorama. A wrought-iron aerial staircase is also to be found, closed to garden visitors, descending to the sea from the gardens, and formerly used by the Greek royal family as a shortcut to the baths. Following the end of the Greek monarchy, the old Royal Gardens are now known as the "Garden of the People" (Ο Κήπος του Λαού).

== Gallery ==
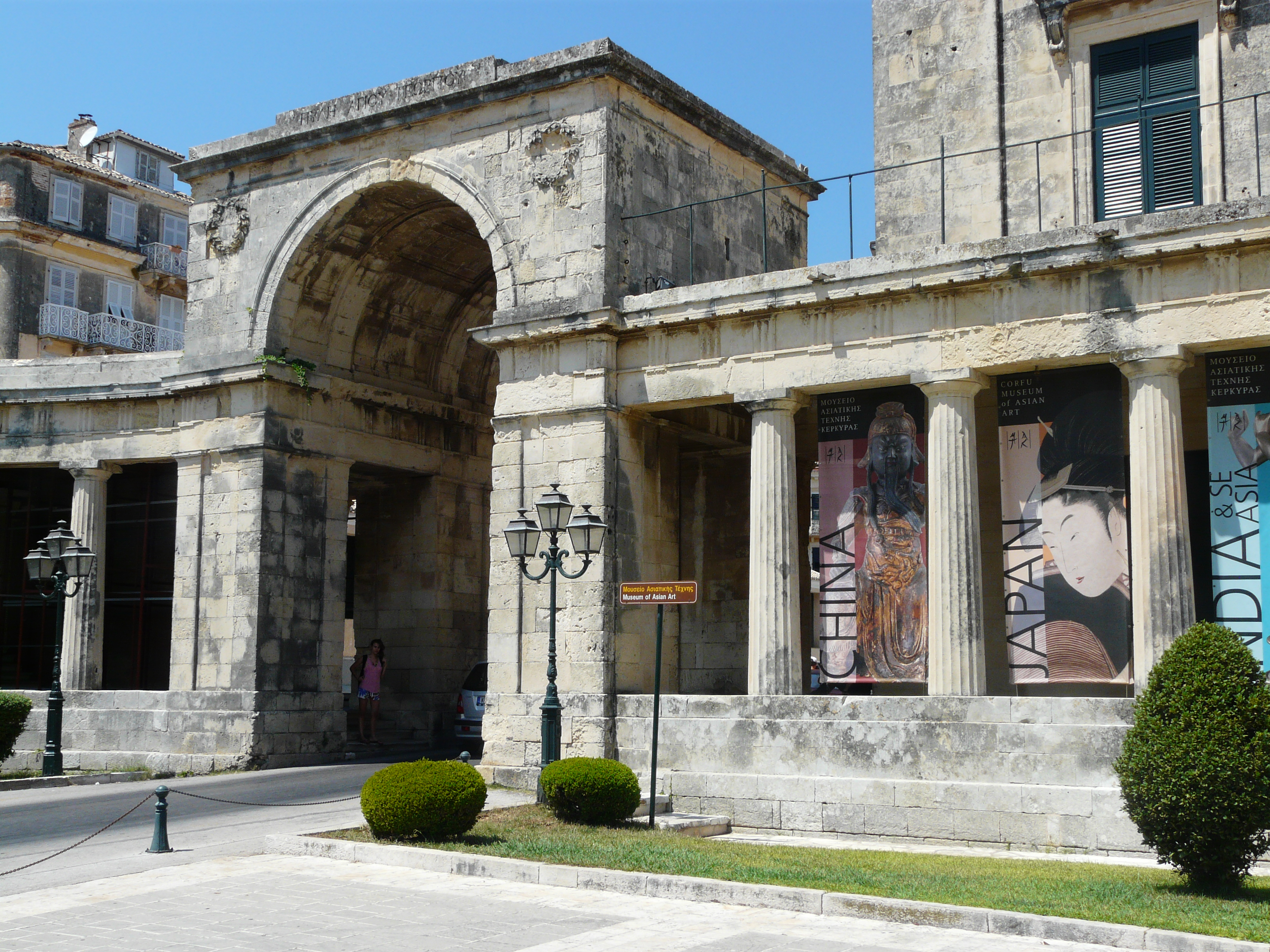
View of the entrance

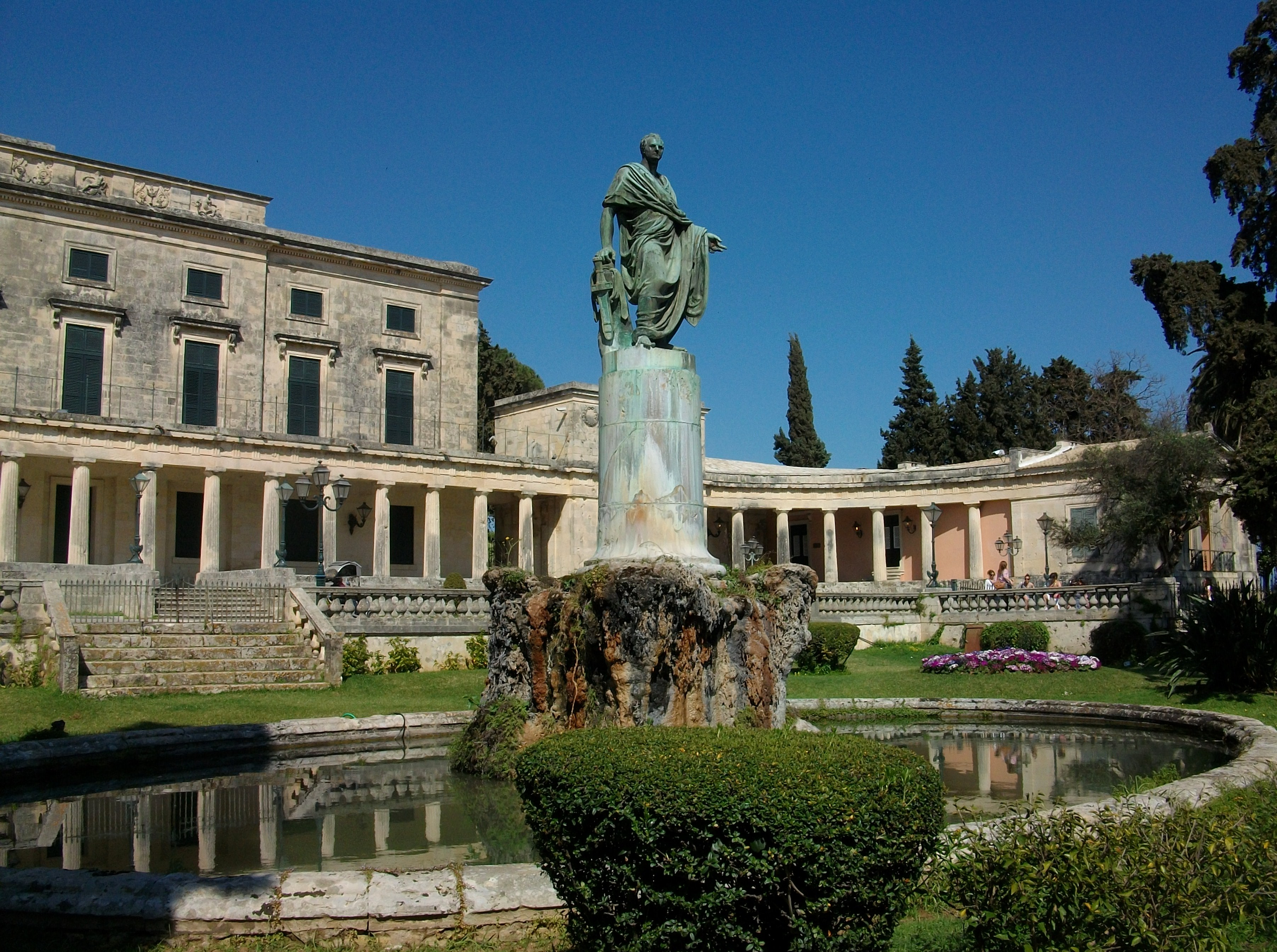
Statue of
Sir Frederick Adam
by Pavlos Prosalentis

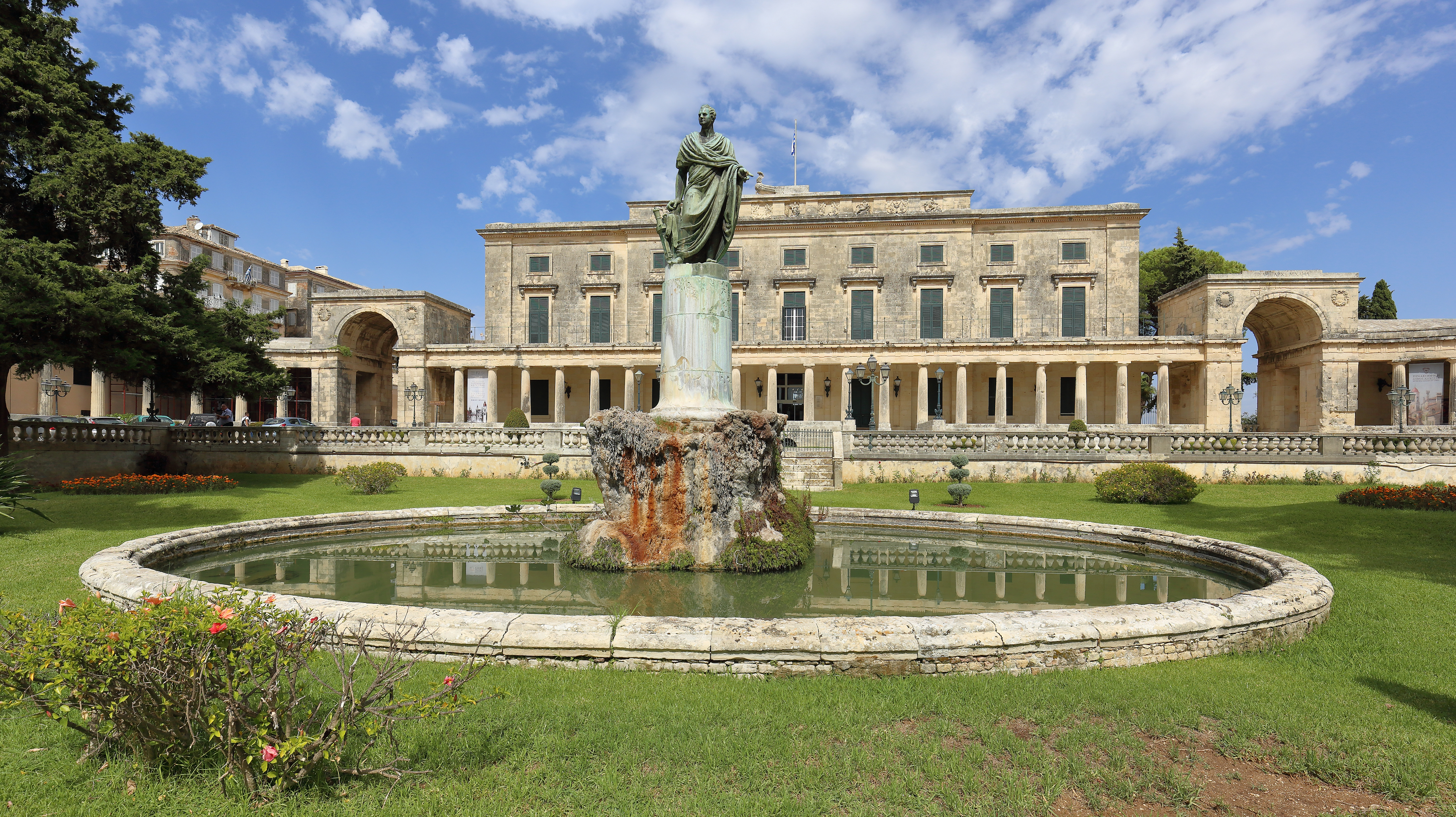
Front view

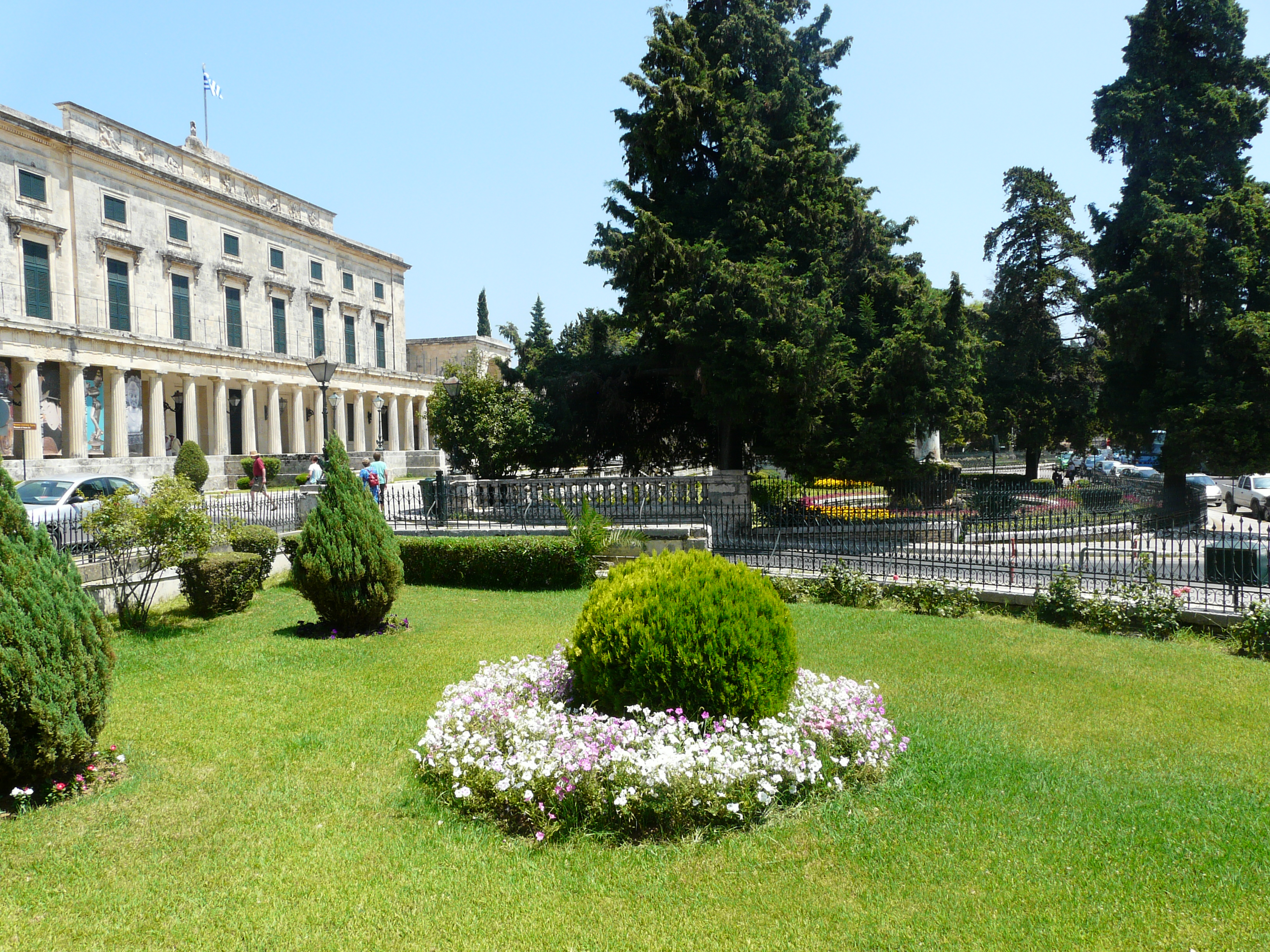
Gardens

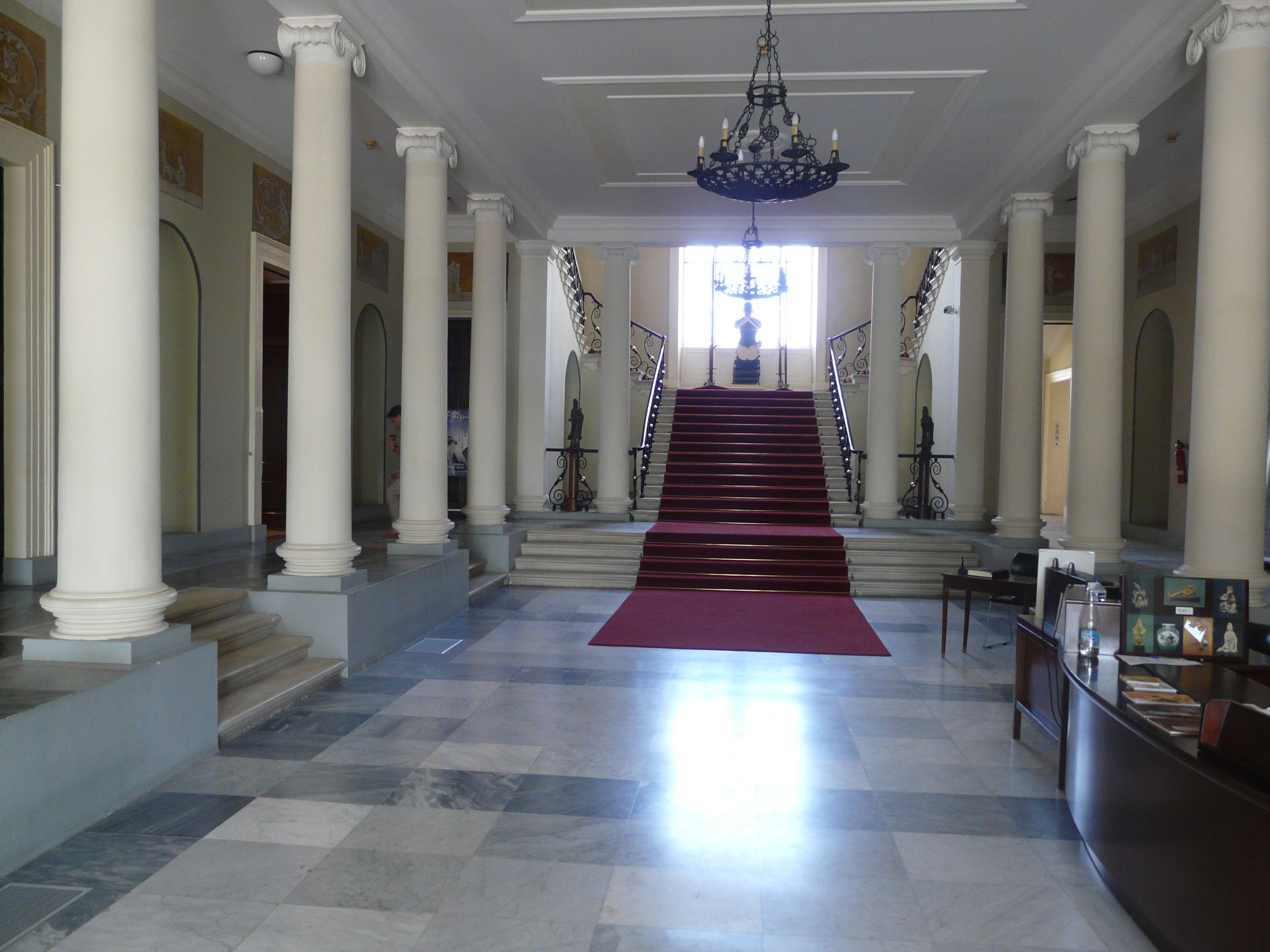
Interior

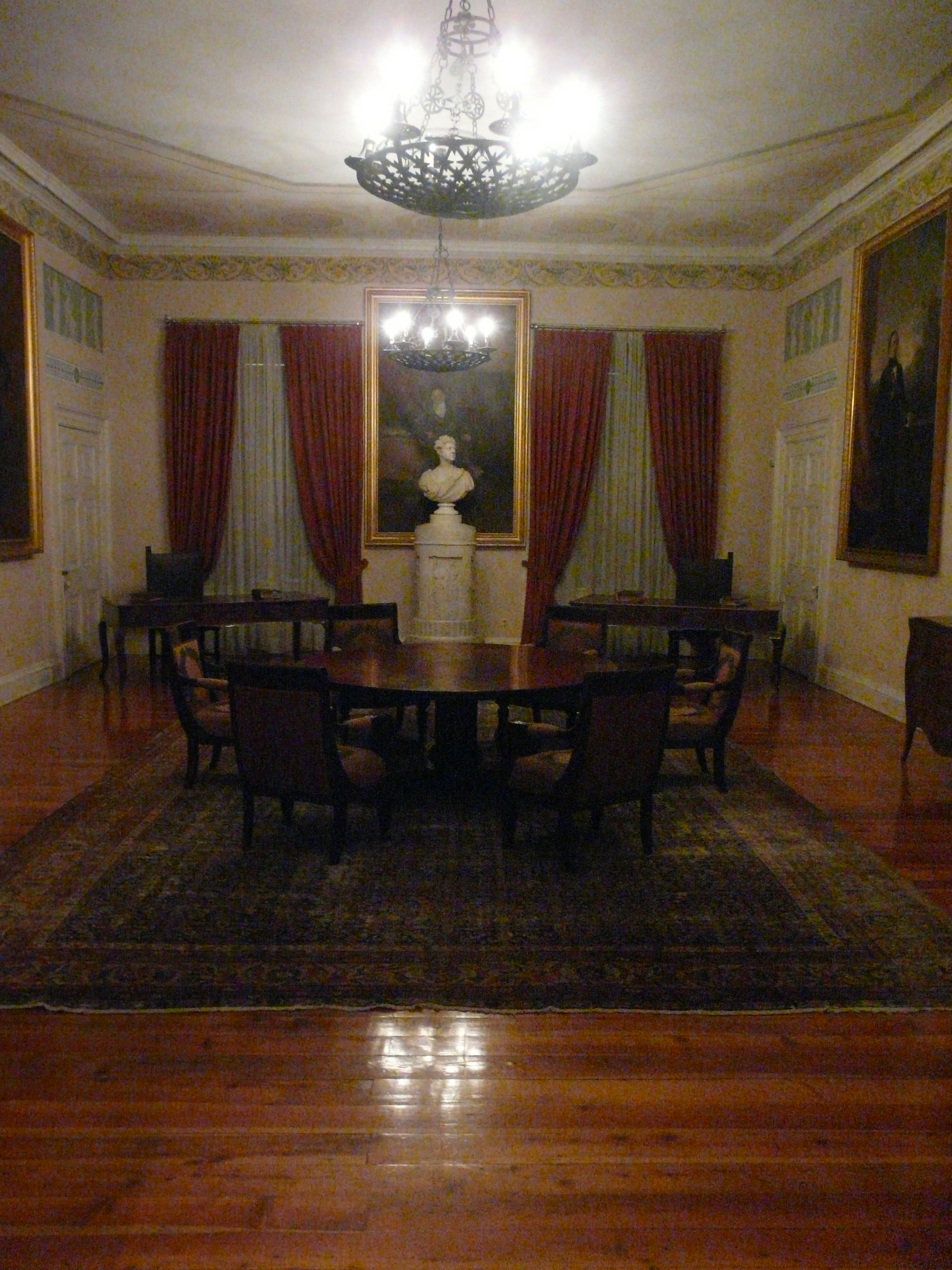
Meeting room of the Ionian Senate

== Bibliography ==
- Kardamitsi-Adami, Maro (2009). Palaces in Greece. Melissa Books. ISBN 978-960-204-289-2.
- Great Palaces. Spring Books. 1964.
