= Cricket in Greece =

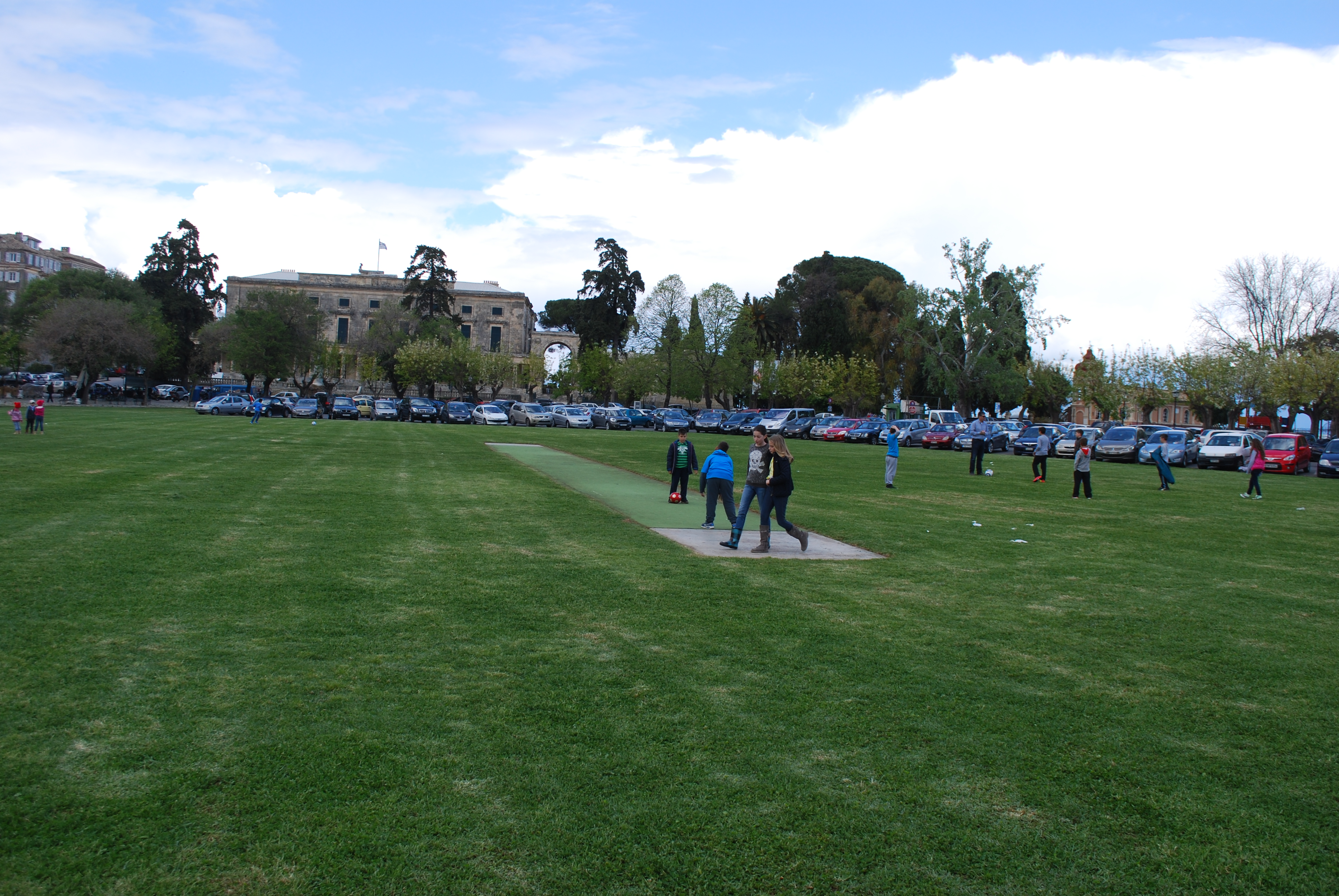
Spianada Square in Corfu. It is used as cricket ground.

Cricket is a sport relatively unknown to most Greeks. However, it is believed that this sport or one similar was played in ancient Greece. This conclusion is drawn from an ancient relief that depicts athletes with clubs and ball. In modern era the cricket in Greece is connected with Corfu where this sport is pretty popular. The sport was imported to Corfu by the British when the Ionian Islands were under British rule (1815–64). The first teams in the island were created after the departure of the British, shortly after 1864. In 1893, the still existing club Kerkyraikos G.S. (Corfiot Athletic Club) was founded. Other cricket clubs were founded in subsequent years. In 1925 the club GSK Vyron was founded, and in 1976 the club AO Faiax was founded. The Hellenic Cricket Federation was founded in 1996. It is the only Greek sport federation that is not based in Athens but based in Corfu.

== National team ==
The Greek national team established after the creation of Hellenic Cricket Federation. It is an affiliate member of the International Cricket Council. So far it has taken part in European cricket championships. Two of them have hosted in Greece, concretely in Corfu, the European Championship division five, in 2009 and the European championship division two, in 2012.

== The championship ==
The Hellenic Cricket Federation organises a Greek Men's Cricket Championship, Greek Women's Cricket Championship, Greek Cricket Cup, and various youth Championships. All championships comprise indoor and outdoor competitions. There are 20 clubs that are members of the federation. Almost all teams are based in Corfu, besides a few based in Athens and Ioannina.
