= Corfu (city) =

Capital of the island of Corfu, Greece

Corfu Κέρκυρα (Χώρα)
- Municipal unit
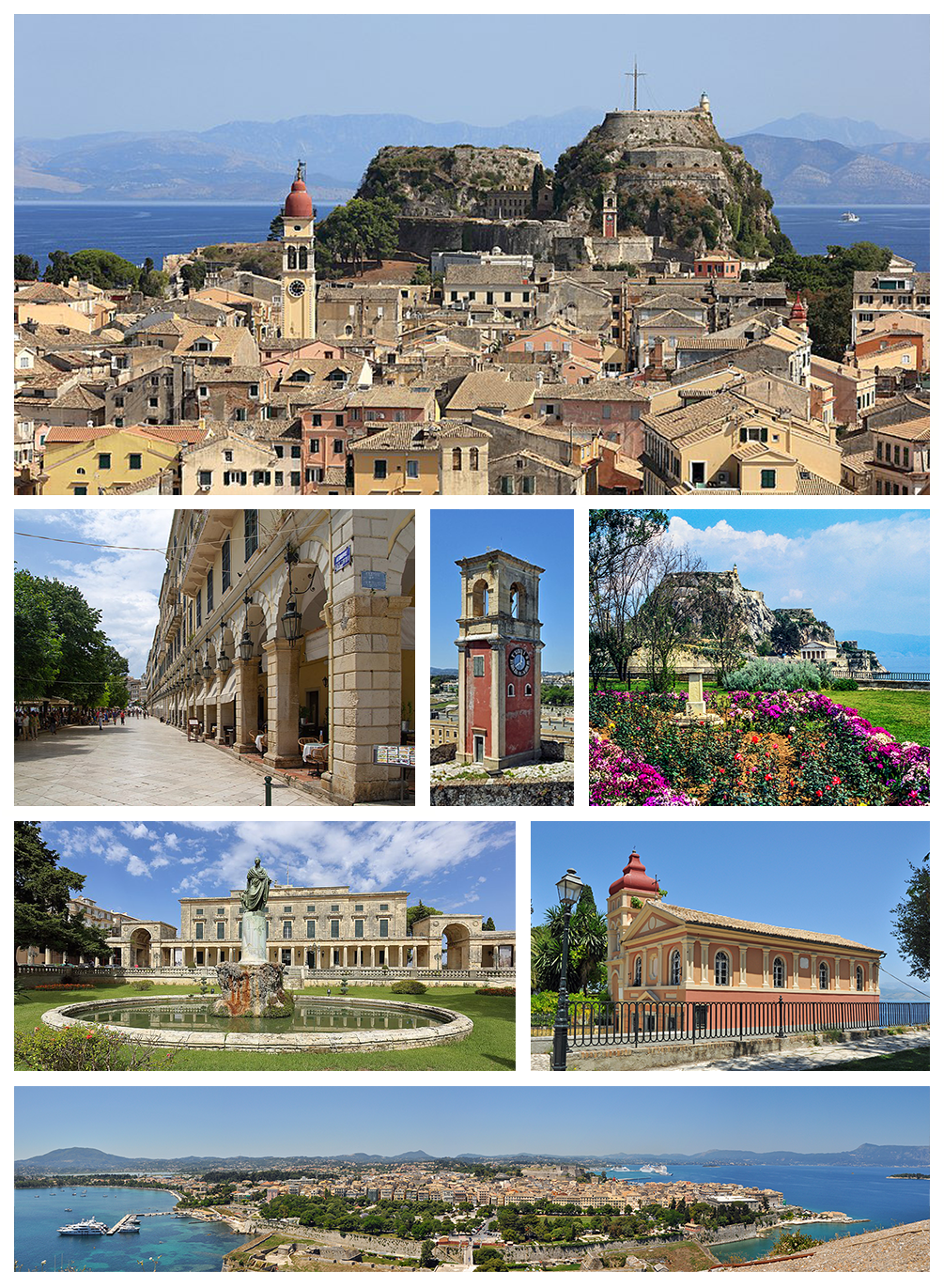
- Clockwise from top: The Old Venetian Fortress and the Old Town of Corfu, as seen from the New Fortress, Venetian bell tower of Corfu, The Natura 2000-protected seaside from Kanoni to Mesoggi, Church of the Virgin Mary Mandrakina, Panoramic view of the city of Corfu, Palace of St. Michael and St. George, A characteristic street of Corfu.

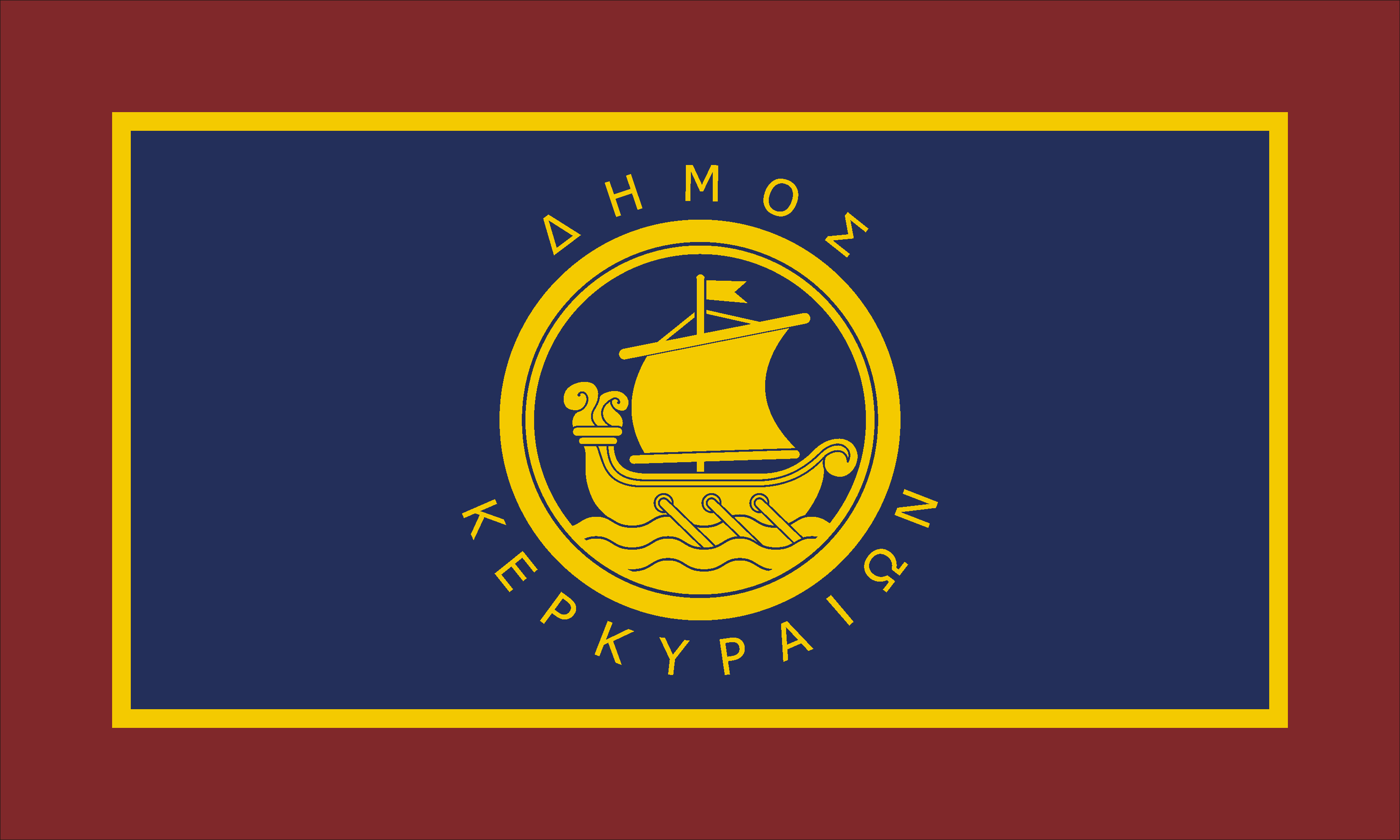
- Flag

- Location within the regional unit

- Location within Greece
- Coordinates: 39°37′26″N 19°55′17″E
- Country: Greece
- Administrative region: Ionian Islands
- Regional unit: Corfu
- Municipality: Central Corfu and Diapontia Islands

Area
  - Municipal unit: 41.905 km^{2} (16.180 sq mi)

Population (2021)
  - Municipal unit: 40,047
  - Municipal unit density: 955.66/km^{2} (2,475.2/sq mi)
  - Community: 30,737
- Demonym(s): Corfiot (Greek: Κερκυραίος, -α "Kerkyreos")
- Time zone: UTC+2 (EET)
  - Summer (DST): UTC+3 (EEST)
- Postal code: 49100
- Area code: 26610
- Vehicle registration: ΚΥ
- Website: www.corfu.gr

UNESCO World Heritage Site
- Official name: Old Town of Corfu
- Criteria: Cultural: (iv)
- Reference: 978
- Inscription: 2007 (31st Session)
- Area: 70 ha (170 acres)
- Buffer zone: 162 ha (400 acres)

Corfu (/kɔːrˈf(j)uː/, also US: /ˈkɔːrf(j)uː/) or Kerkyra (Greek: Κέρκυρα, romanized: Kérkyra, pronounced [ˈcercira]; Ancient Greek: Κόρκυρα, romanized: Kórkyra, pronounced [kórkyra]; Medieval Greek: Κορυφώ, romanized: Koryfó; Italian: Corfù; Latin: Corcyra) is a city and a former municipality on the island of Corfu, Ionian Islands, Greece. Since the 2019 local government reform, it is part of the municipality Central Corfu and Diapontian Islands. It is the capital of the municipality and of the Corfu regional unit. The city also serves as a capital for the region of the Ionian Islands. The city (with a population of 23,541 residents, while the whole island has a population of 99,134 residents) is a major tourist attraction and Greek regional centre and has played an important role in Greek history since antiquity.

== History ==
The ancient city of Corfu, known as Korkyra, took part in the Battle of Sybota which was a catalyst for the Peloponnesian War, and, according to Thucydides, the largest naval battle between Greek city states until that time. Thucydides also reports that Korkyra was one of the three great naval powers of fifth-century-BC Greece, along with Athens and Corinth. Medieval castles punctuating strategic locations across the city are a legacy of struggles in the Middle Ages against invasions by pirates and the Ottomans. The city has become known since the Middle Ages as Kastropolis (Castle City) because of its two castles.

From 1386 to 1797, Corfu was ruled by Venetian nobility; much of the city reflects this era when the island belonged to the Republic of Venice, with multi-storied buildings on narrow lanes. The Old Town of Corfu has clear Venetian influence. The city was subjected to four notable sieges in 1537, 1571, 1573 and 1716, in which the strength of the city defenses asserted itself time after time, mainly because of the effectiveness of the powerful Venetian fortifications. Writer Will Durant claimed that Corfu owed to the Republic of Venice the fact that it was the only part of Greece never conquered by the Ottomans.

After the Treaty of Campo Formio, which marked the dissolution of the Republic of Venice in 1797, Corfu came under French control. The French rule lasted until 1799 and ended when a Russian-Ottoman alliance replaced the French and founded the Septinsular Republic (State of the Ionian Islands) formally in 1800, with Corfu serving as its capital. French administration returned in 1807 following the Treaty of Tilsit, before the islands came under British protection in 1815 following the Treaty of Paris, agreed by the major European powers.

Throughout the British rule, Corfu went through several changes. Sir Thomas Maitland (1816–1824) focused on developing the Spianada in the city. After Maitland’s death, he was succeeded by Sir Frederic Adam (1824–1832), whose administration introduced several public improvements. These included the building of an aqueduct and making changes to the Old Citadel, such as the construction of hospital buildings, military buildings and defensive improvements (The Crescent Battery). The Ionian Academy was also opened in 1824 during Adam’s administration, as part of changes to the island’s education. The British also made changes to housing across the city. They began removing parts of the defensive walls on the western side allowing space for the building of new residential areas outside the old city. In 1864, following the Treaty of London, the Ionian Islands were united with Greece, and Greek administration was established on Corfu.

In 2007, the old town of the city was inscribed on the UNESCO World Heritage List. The municipal unit of Corfu city has a land area of 41.905 km^{2} (16.180 sq mi) and a total population of 40,047 inhabitants. Besides the city of Corfu/Kérkyra, its largest other towns are Kanáli (population 4,786), Potamós (3,840), Kontókali (1,660), Alepoú (3,149), and Gouviá (838).

== Palaiopolis ==
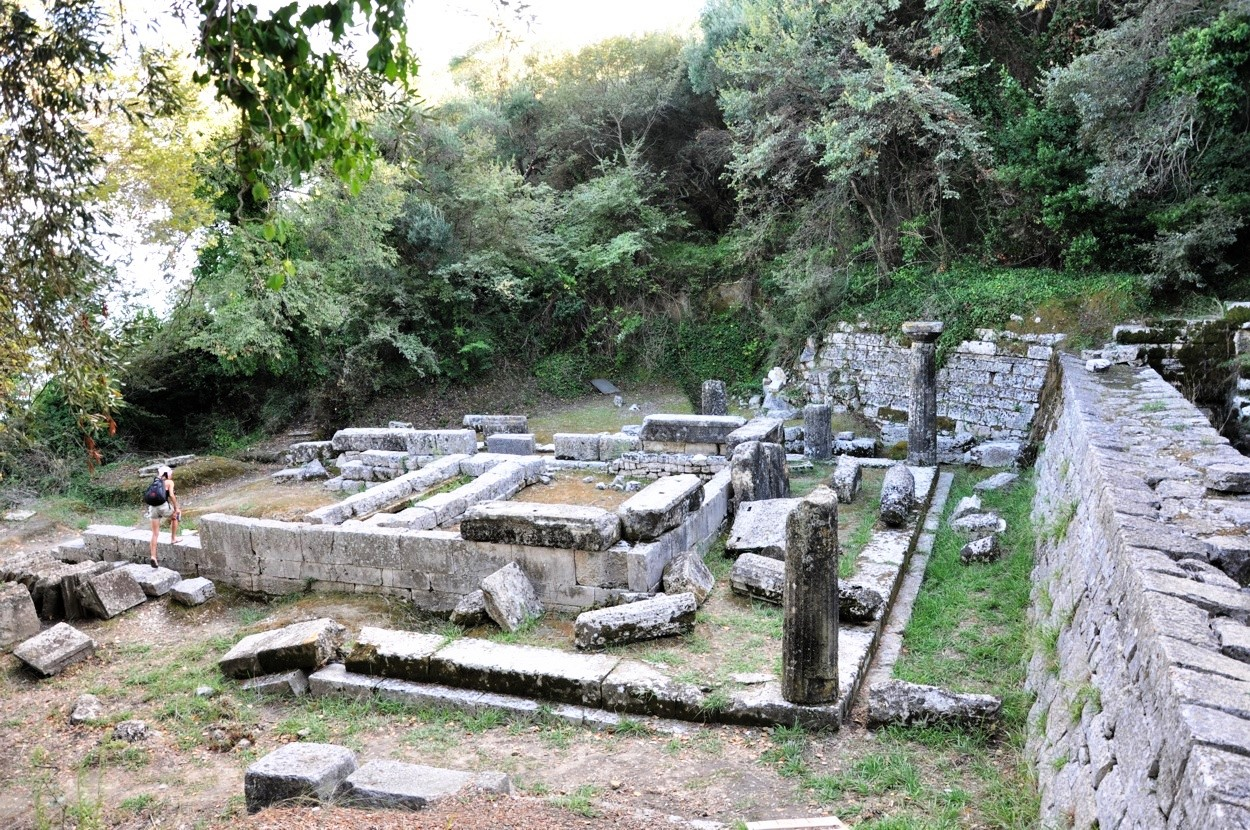
Kardaki Temple in Corfu

In the city of Corfu, the ruins of the ancient city of Korkyra, also known as Palaiopolis, include ancient temples which were excavated at the location of the palace of Mon Repos, which was built on the ruins of the Palaiopolis. The temples are: Kardaki Temple, Temple of Artemis, and the Temple of Hera. Hera's temple is situated at the western limits of Mon Repos, close to Kardaki Temple and to the northwest. It is approximately 700 m. to the southeast of the Temple of Artemis in Corfu. Hera's Temple was built at the top of Analipsis Hill, and, because of its prominent location, it was highly visible to ships passing close to the waterfront of ancient Korkyra.

== Architecture ==
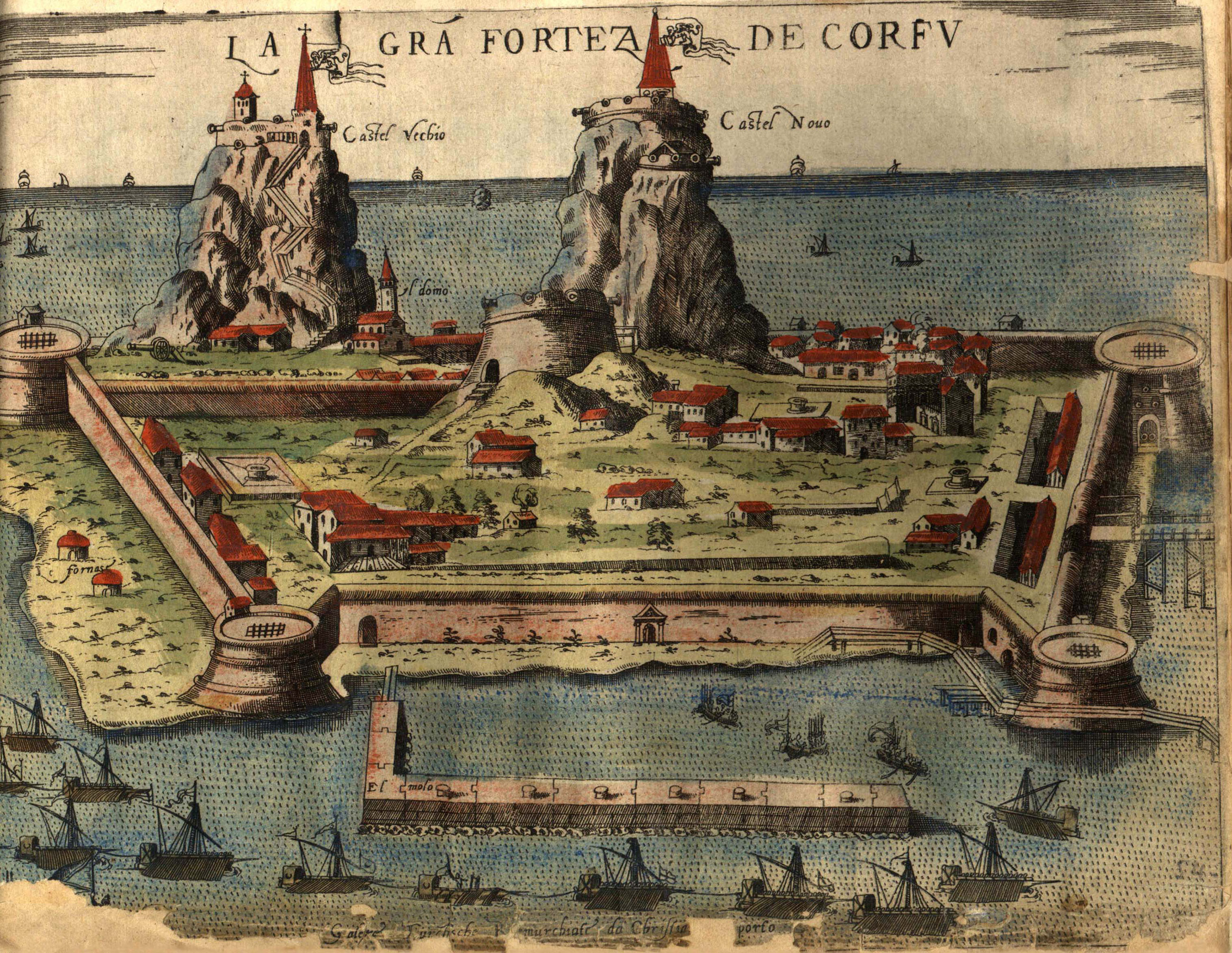
Map of the "Old Fortress" of Corfu, 1573.

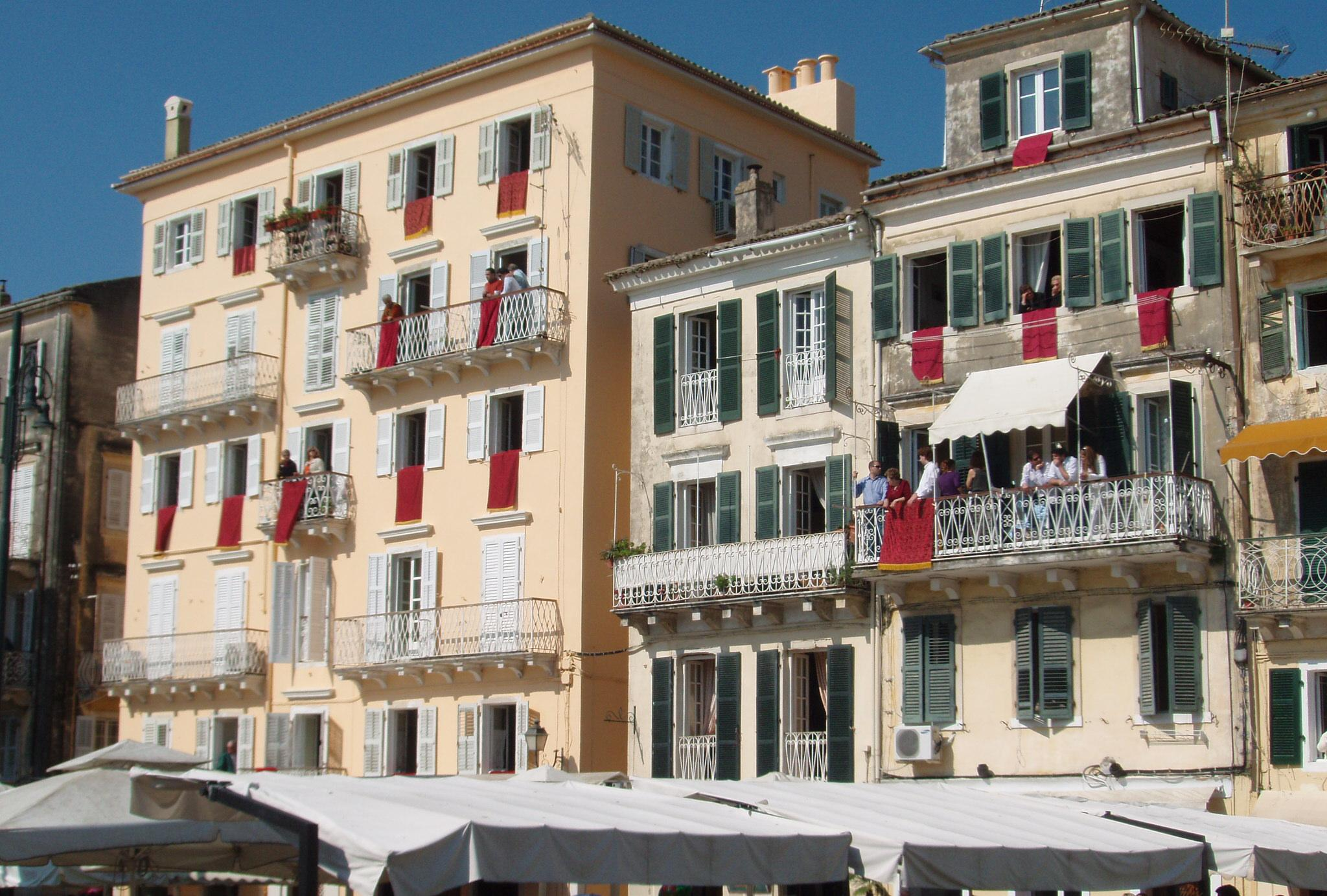
Typical houses of Corfu city.

In several parts of the town may be found houses of the Venetian time, with some traces of past splendour. The Palace of St. Michael and St. George, built in 1815 by Sir Thomas Maitland (1759–1824; Lord High Commissioner of the Ionian Islands) is a large structure of white Maltese stone. Near Gastouri stands the Pompeian style Achilleion, the palace built for the Empress Elizabeth of Austria, and purchased in 1907 by the German emperor, William II.

Of the thirty-seven Greek churches the most important are the cathedral, dedicated to Our Lady of the Cave; St. Spiridon's, with the tomb of the patron saint of the island; and the suburban church of St Jason and St Sosipater, reputedly the oldest in the island. The city is the seat of a Greek and a Roman Catholic archbishop; and it possesses a gymnasium, a theatre, an agricultural and industrial society, and a library and museum preserved in the buildings formerly devoted to the university, which was founded by Frederick North, 5th Earl of Guilford (1766–1827, himself the first chancellor in 1824) in 1823, but disestablished on the cessation of the British protectorate.

Based on the ICOMOS evaluation of the old town of Corfu, it was inscribed on the World Heritage List. The ICOMOS experts have noted that "about 70% of the pre-20th century buildings date from the British period" and that "whole blocks were destroyed" in the Old Town by the German World War II blitzes; these were "replaced by new constructions in the 1960s and 1970s". The urban fabric was classified as being predominantly of the Neoclassical period "without special architectural features for which it could be distinguished". However, they note that the layout and structure of the city, including its Venetian fortifications, make Corfu a quintessential example of a fortified maritime city.

== Layout ==
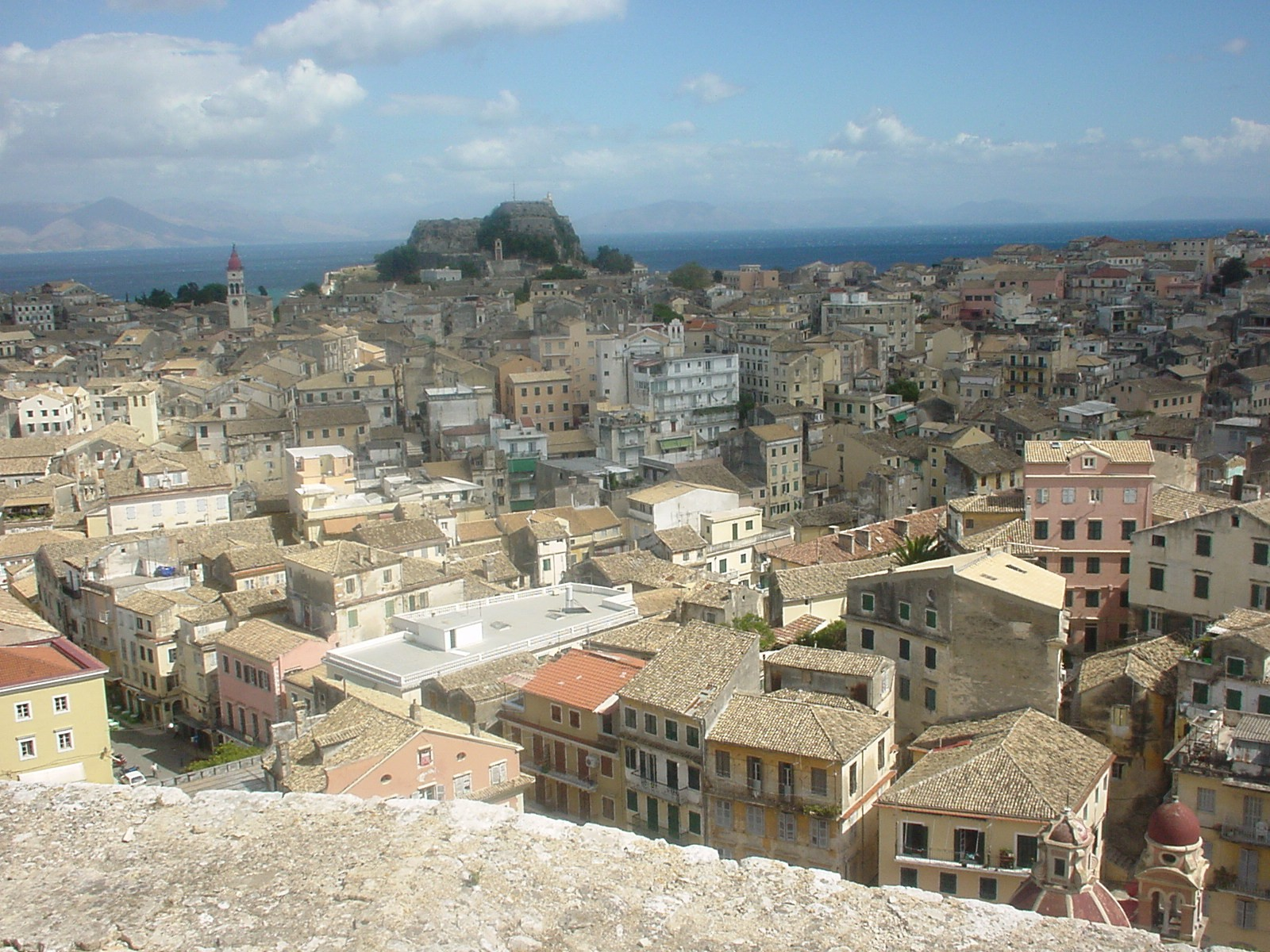
View of the old town

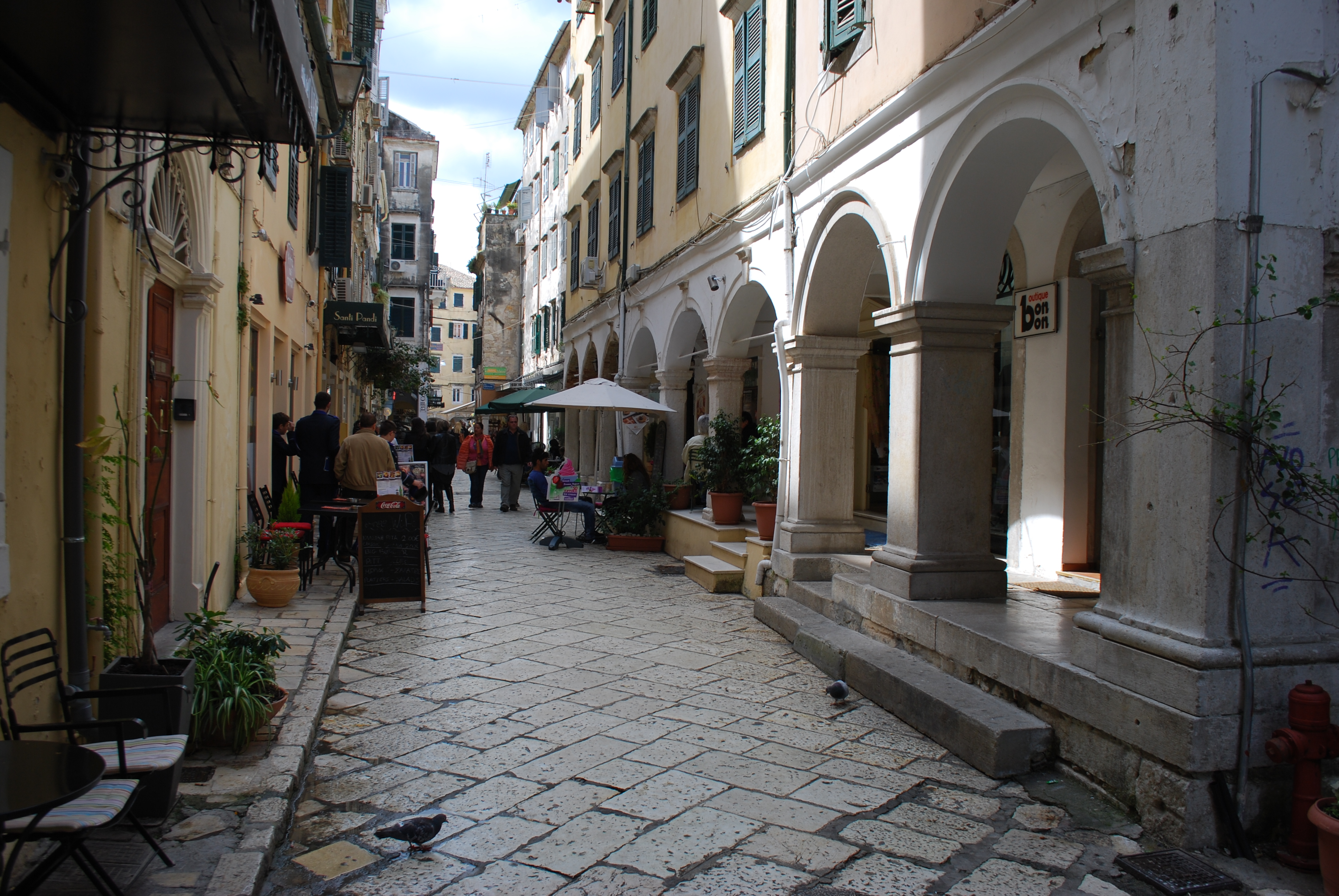
Agion Panton Street

The town of Corfu stands on the broad part of a peninsula, whose termination in the Venetian citadel (Greek: Παλαιό Φρούριο) is cut off from it by an artificial fosse formed in a natural gully, with a salt-water ditch at the bottom, that serves also as a kind of marina known as Contra-Fossa. Owing to the limitations of being built inside of fortifications, the cobblestone streets of Corfu, called "kantounia" (καντούνια), are often narrow, sometimes too narrow for vehicular traffic. There is promenade by the seashore towards the bay of Garitsa (Γαρίτσα), and also an esplanade between the town and the citadel called Liston (Λιστόν) where there are many upscale restaurants and European style bistros. The origin of the name Liston has several explanations: many former Venetian cities have a square of that name, coming from a Venetian word meaning evening promenade, but it can also refer to the closed-list aspect of an up-scale area reserved to the nobility registered in the Libro d'Oro.

The citadel was depicted on the reverse of the Greek 500 drachmas banknote of 1983-2001.

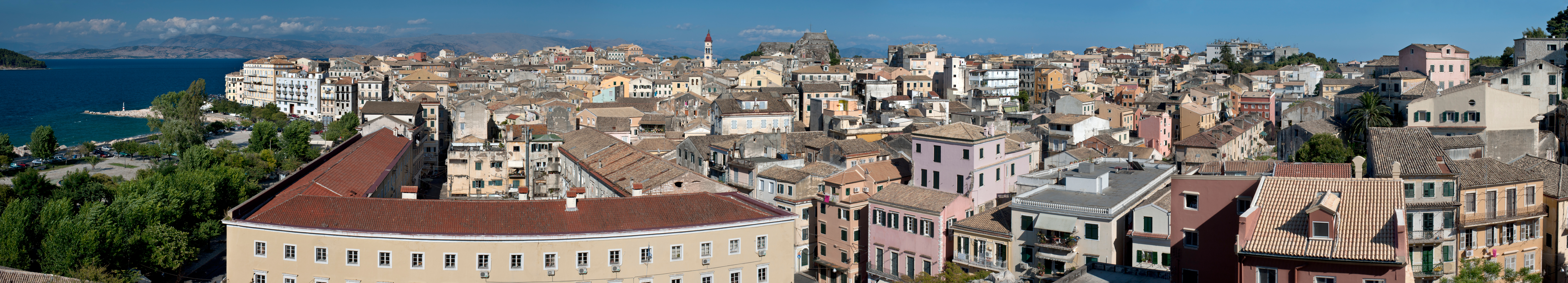
Panoramic view of the old town

== Culture ==
The city of Corfu has a long tradition in the fine arts. The Philharmonic Society of Corfu is part of that tradition. The Museum of the Philharmonic Society of Corfu presents in detail the musical heritage of the island.

The Old Philharmonic Society, also known as the Palaia Philharmoniki, was established in Corfu in September 1840. It is thought to have been created to reflect the growing importance of music education on the island. The society aimed to make music accessible to people from different social backgrounds. After music teaching at the Ionian Academy declined, the Philharmonic Society took on an important role in providing music education in Corfu.

The success of Corfu's musical tradition continued with the establishment of other societies. One of these was the Mantzaros Philharmonic Society, which was established in Corfu in early 1890, initially as a recreational association. Its early membership and original purpose were closely connected to the working class. Over time, it aimed to develop the teaching and promotion of music through music schools and musical ensembles. Its first public performance took place during the procession of Saint Spyridon in November 1890.

In modern-day Corfu, the Philharmonic societies continue to play an important role in the island’s cultural life, particularly during Easter celebrations. The bands accompany religious processions throughout Holy Week, performing traditional music during events such as the Good Friday Epitaphios processions and the Holy Saturday celebrations. These performances form a long-standing part of Corfu's Easter traditions and continue to show the importance of music within the island's religious and cultural identity.

== Sports ==
Corfu is the only place in Greece where cricket is popular. It was imported into the island during British rule. The Hellenic Cricket Federation is based in Corfu and it is the only Greek sport federation that is based outside Athens. The most Greek cricket clubs are based in Corfu and they star in the Greek Championship. Notable cricket clubs of Corfu are Kerkyraikos G.S. (KGS), founded in 1893, GSK Vyron, founded in 1925 and AO Phaeax founded in 1976.

The first recorded cricket match in Greece took place in Corfu on 23 April 1823, during the period of British rule. The match was played between British Navy officers and British soldiers on the Spianada. The sport originated in south-east England. However, it gradually gained interest among the local population. British residents helped introduce the game to young Corfiots. By 1835, two local teams had emerged, known as the Megaloi and the Microi, reflecting the social divisions within the island's community.

When the British departed Corfu in 1864, cricket continued to be played by Corfu residents. The original teams developed into separate sporting organisations, including the Gongakis Company and the Kamvisis Club. However, by the 1890s, participation in the sport had declined and the two organisations merged in 1893 to form a larger club, known as the Gymnastikos (Kerkyraikos G.S.), with the aim of attracting a wider membership. Cricket experienced a revival after the First World War, with the formation of the Ergatikos Club in 1923, which continued the tradition of organised local cricket.

Due to its popularity in the past, cricket experienced another revival in Corfu during the late twentieth century. A notable moment came in 1978, when a Corfu XI played against the Lord's Taverners, a British touring team that included former professional cricketers. The match helped raise awareness of cricket on the island and encouraged renewed interest in the sport. Today, cricket continues to be played on the Spianada, where official tournaments and friendly matches take place. Its continued popularity suggests how the sport has remained an important part of Corfu's culture since it was first introduced during British rule.

In other sports, Corfu has two teams with presence in higher divisions. The football club A.O. Kerkyra, founded in 1968, that played in Super League Greece and the water polo club NAO Kerkyra (NAOK) founded in 1935, with earlier presence in A1 Ethniki Polo.

Sport clubs based in Ampelokipoi
Club	Founded	Sports	Achievements
Kerkyraikos G.S.	1893	Basketball, Cricket, Track and Field	Panhellenic titles in Cricket, earlier presence in Beta Ethniki Basketball
GSK Byron	1925	Cricket	Panhellenic titles in Cricket,
Olympos Kerkyras	1934	Football	Earlier presence in Gamma Ethniki
NAO Kerkyra (NAOK)	1935	Water Polo, Swimming	Earlier presence in A1 Ethniki Water Polo
A.O. Kerkyra	1968	Football	Earlier presence in Super League Greece
AO Phaeax	1976	Basketball, Cricket, Handball	Panhellenic titles in Cricket

== Climate ==
Corfu city has a hot-summer Mediterranean climate (Csa). The summers are hot and generally dry but with high relative humidity and daytime temperatures reaching 33 °C (91 °F). The winters are mild and wet, with temperatures around 10 °C (50 °F).

Climate data for Corfu (1955-2010) HNMS 1 m asl
Month	Jan	Feb	Mar	Apr	May	Jun	Jul	Aug	Sep	Oct	Nov	Dec	Year
Record high °C (°F)	21.0 (69.8)	23.0 (73.4)	26.0 (78.8)	28.0 (82.4)	34.0 (93.2)	41.0 (105.8)	42.8 (109.0)	40.0 (104.0)	37.4 (99.3)	33.0 (91.4)	27.8 (82.0)	22.0 (71.6)	42.8 (109.0)
Mean daily maximum °C (°F)	13.9 (57.0)	14.1 (57.4)	16.0 (60.8)	19.1 (66.4)	24.0 (75.2)	28.2 (82.8)	31.2 (88.2)	31.5 (88.7)	27.5 (81.5)	23.2 (73.8)	18.7 (65.7)	15.2 (59.4)	21.9 (71.4)
Daily mean °C (°F)	9.8 (49.6)	10.2 (50.4)	12.1 (53.8)	15.2 (59.4)	19.9 (67.8)	24.2 (75.6)	26.7 (80.1)	26.6 (79.9)	22.7 (72.9)	18.5 (65.3)	14.4 (57.9)	11.2 (52.2)	17.6 (63.7)
Mean daily minimum °C (°F)	5.3 (41.5)	5.7 (42.3)	7.1 (44.8)	9.6 (49.3)	13.3 (55.9)	16.9 (62.4)	18.9 (66.0)	19.3 (66.7)	16.8 (62.2)	13.7 (56.7)	10.2 (50.4)	7.0 (44.6)	12.0 (53.6)
Record low °C (°F)	−6.0 (21.2)	−4.2 (24.4)	−4.4 (24.1)	−0.2 (31.6)	4.6 (40.3)	8.7 (47.7)	10.0 (50.0)	11.3 (52.3)	7.2 (45.0)	2.8 (37.0)	−2.2 (28.0)	−2.0 (28.4)	−6.0 (21.2)
Average rainfall mm (inches)	135.8 (5.35)	123.1 (4.85)	99.6 (3.92)	65.2 (2.57)	36.5 (1.44)	15.5 (0.61)	8.7 (0.34)	21.7 (0.85)	87.8 (3.46)	140.4 (5.53)	187.1 (7.37)	189.9 (7.48)	1,111.3 (43.75)
Average rainy days	14.8	13.4	12.9	12.2	7.7	4.8	3.3	3.3	7.4	11.4	14.7	16.5	122.4
Average relative humidity (%)	75.6	74.1	73.1	72.5	69.2	63.2	61.7	61.7	70.3	74.9	77.5	77.1	70.9
Mean monthly sunshine hours	117.7	116.8	116.0	206.5	276.8	324.2	364.5	332.8	257.1	188.9	133.5	110.9	2,545.7
Source 1: InfoClimat extremes 1991-present Hellenic National Meteorological Service
Source 2: NOAA (extremes and sun 1961−1990)

== Government ==
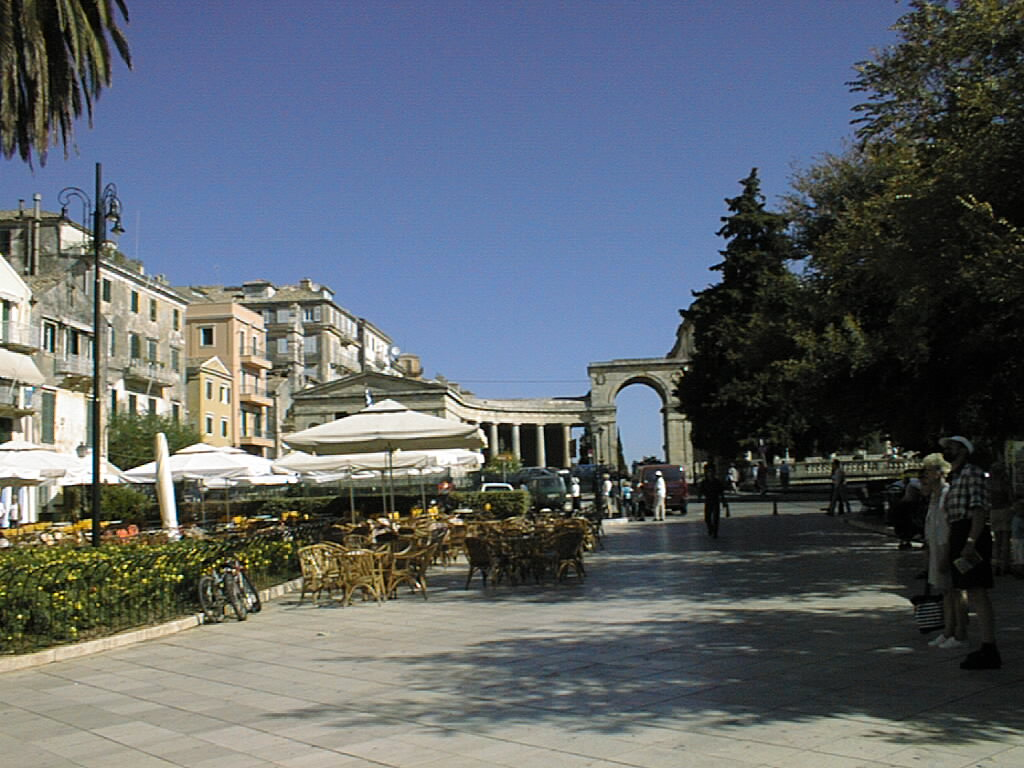
Spianada Square

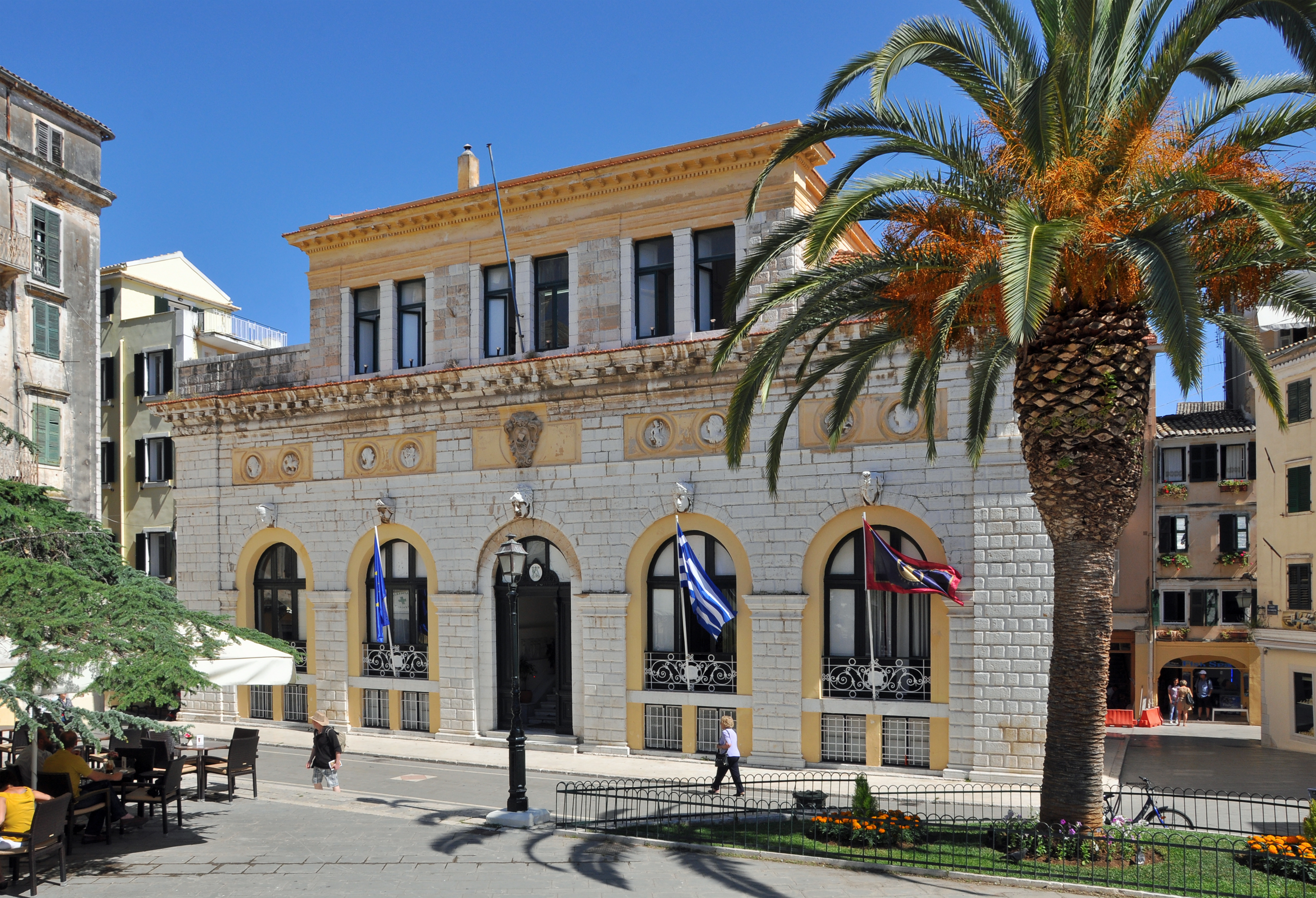
The City Hall (former Nobile Teatro di San Giacomo di Corfù).

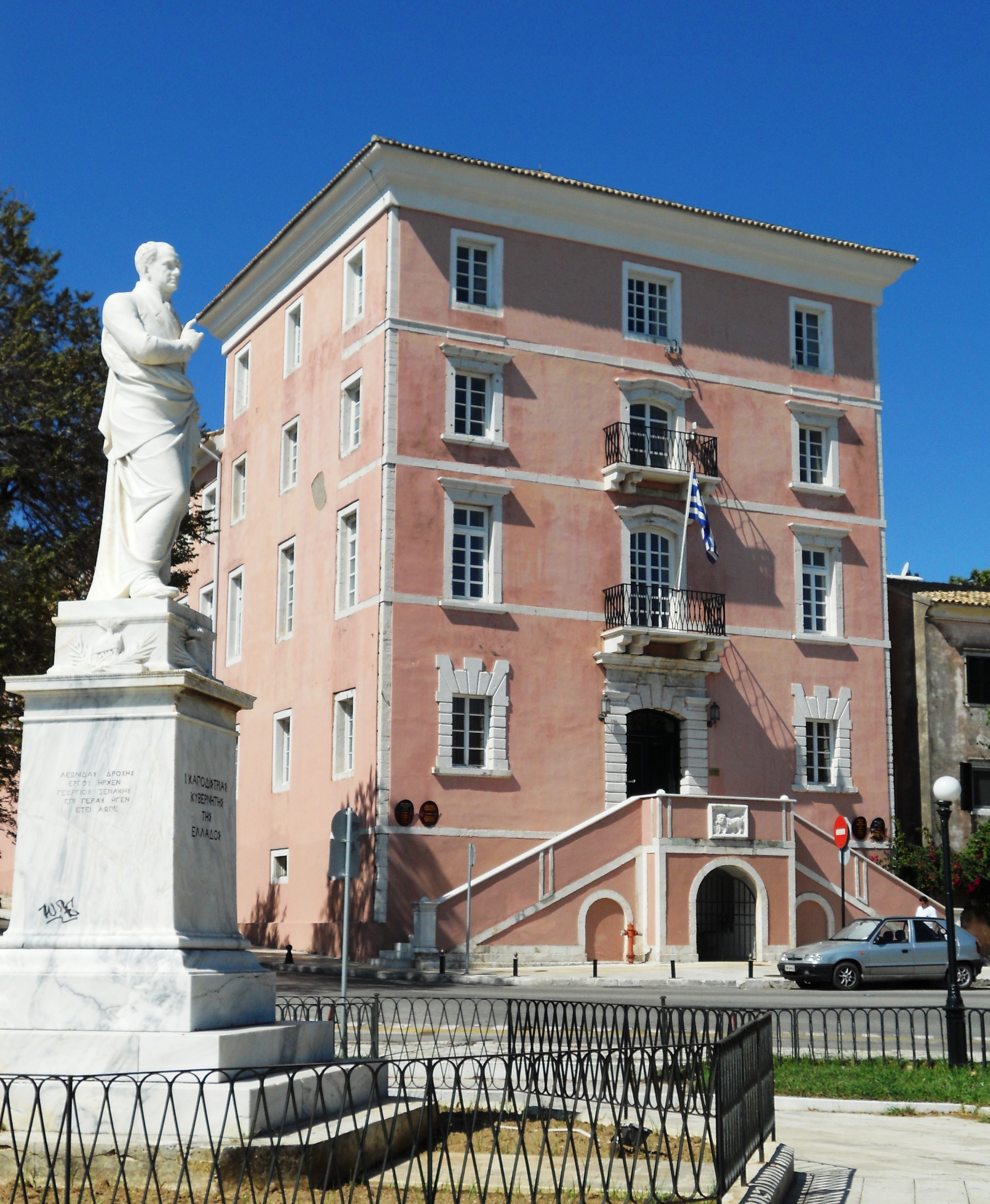
Statue of Ioannis Kapodistrias, by sculptor Leonidas Drosis, with the Ionian Academy in the background.

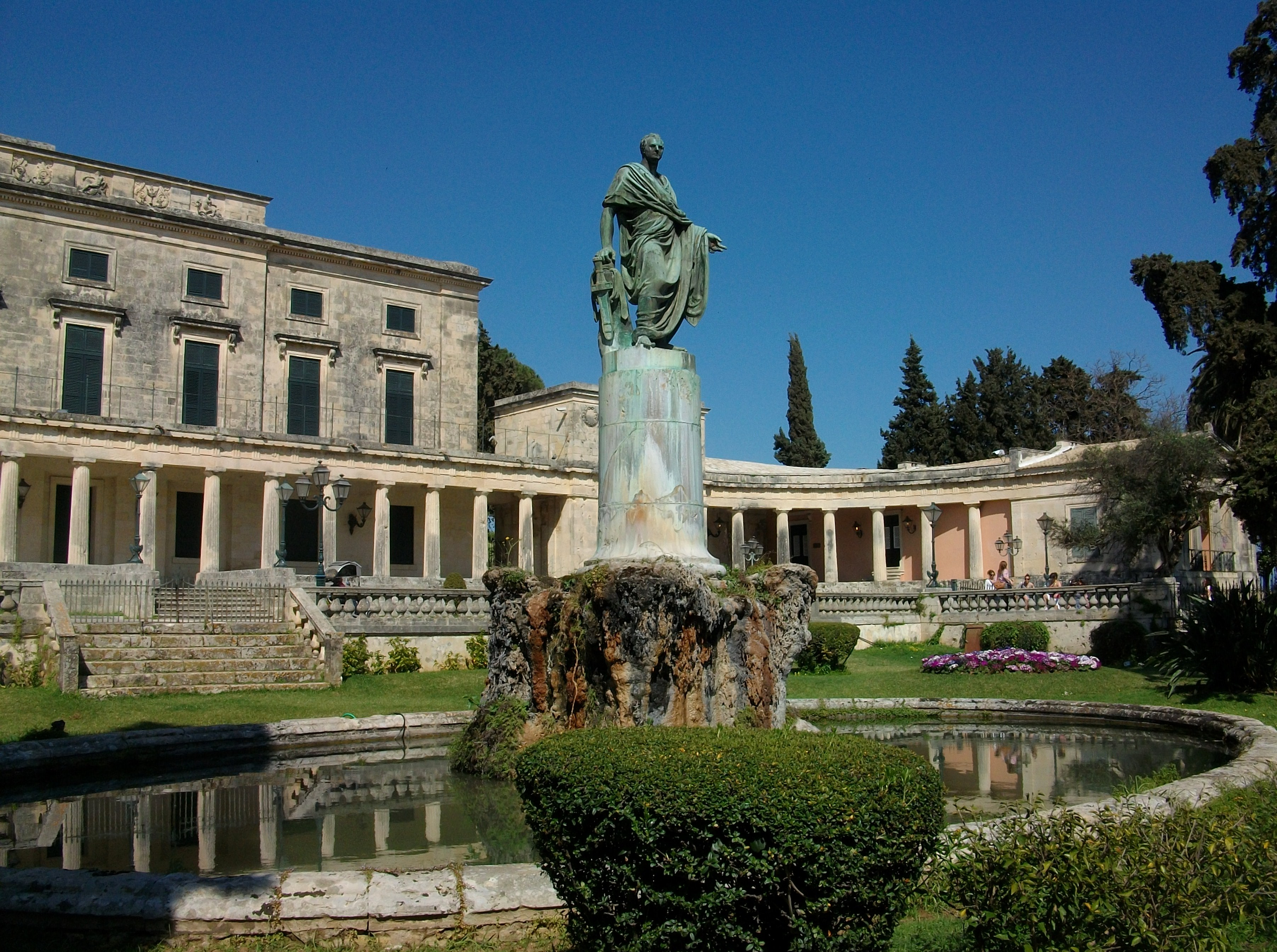
View of the Palace of St. Michael and St. George, with the statue of Sir Frederick Adam, which houses the Museum of Asian Art

=== Mayor history ===
Up until 1866, Corfu had no mayors. This list starts from 1866 and on.

- Nikolaos V. Manesis (1866–1870)
- Christodoulos M. Kiriakis (1870–1879)
- Georgios Theotokis (1879–1885)
- Ioannis Padovas (1885–1887)
- Michael Theotokis (1887–1895)
- Angelos Psoroulas (1895–1899)
- Dimitrios Kollas (1899–1911)
- Ioannis Mavrogiannis (1914–1925)
- Spyridon Kollas (1925–1951)
- Stamatios Desyllas (1951–1955)
- Maria Desylla-Kapodistria (1956–1959), first female mayor in Greece.
- Panagiotis Zafiropoulos (1959–1964)
- Spyros Rath (1964–1967)
- Municipal councils (1967–74)
- Konstantinos Alexopoulos (1974–1975)
- Spyros Rath (1975–1978)
- Ioannis Kourkoulos (1979–1990)
- Chrisanthos Sarlis (1991–2002)
- Alexandros Mastoras (2003–2006)
- Sotirios Micallef (2007–2010)
- Ioannis Trepeklis (2011–2014)
- Kostas Nikolouzos (2014–19)
- Merope Hydraiou (2019–)

== International relations ==
=== Twin towns and sister cities ===
Corfu is twinned with:

- Kruševac, Serbia (1985)
- Paphos, Cyprus (1992)
- Famagusta, Cyprus (1994)
- Meissen, Germany (1996)
- Troisdorf, Germany (1996)
- Asha, Cyprus (1998)
- Brindisi, Italy (1998)
- Vathy, Greece (1998)
- Carovigno, Italy (2000)
- Koper, Slovenia (2000)
- Sarandë, Albania (2001)
- Tremetousia, Cyprus (2001)
- Ioannina, Greece (2002)
- Bethlehem, United States (2013)
- Bar, Montenegro (2017)
- Bari, Italy
- Zemun (Belgrade), Serbia
- Mytilene, Greece

=== Consulates ===
The city hosts consulates from the following countries:

- Austria
- Belgium
- Denmark
- France
- Germany
- Hungary
- Italy
- Netherlands
- Norway
- Portugal
- Russia
- Sweden
- Switzerland
- Serbia
- Spain
- United Kingdom

== Quarters ==
- Paleopolis
- Nèo Frourio
- Paleò Frourio-Aghios Geòrgios
- Faliraki
- Aghios Vlasios-Old Port
- New Port
- Platytera
- Sarocco-Kotsella
- Menekratous
- Analipsi
- Aghia Trias
- Neratzicha
- Anemomylos-Aghios Iàsson
- Figareto-Kardaki
- Stratia
- Kyra Chrysikoù
- Aghios Spyridon
- Spianada-Liston
- Aghios Antonios
- Aghios Iakovos
- Mandraki
- Aghios Ioannis
- Garitsa
- Kanoni
- Kanàlia
- Alepou
- Potamos
- Kontokali
- Evropouloi
- Gouvia
- Kommeno
- Temploni
- Kampiello (old town)
- Spilia
- Mantouki

=== Main streets ===
- Markora Street
- Nikiforou Theotoki Street
- Eugeniou Voulgari Street
- Agiou Spyridonos Street
- Stamati Voulgari
- Philhellinon
- Filarmonikis
- Dousmani
- Moustoxydi
- Agion Panton
- Solomou
- Dimokratias Avenue
- Georgiou Theotoki Avenue
- Mantzarou Street
- Alexandras Avenue
- Margariti
- Aspioti
- Desylla
- Arseniou
- Panagouli

== Media ==
- TV: Corfu TV, Start TV
- Newspapers: Kerkyra Simera

== Gallery ==
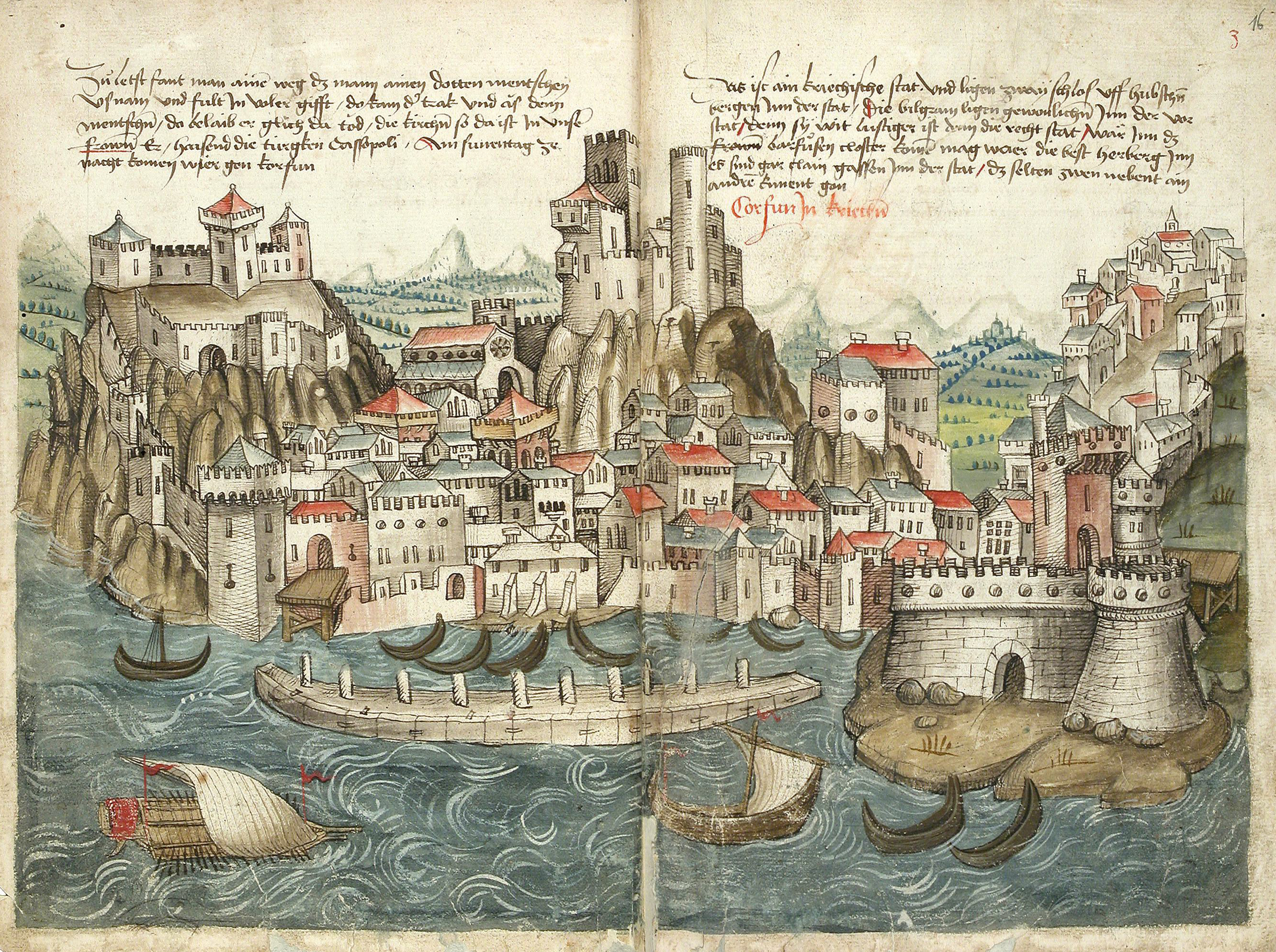
Old depiction of Corfu, 1487

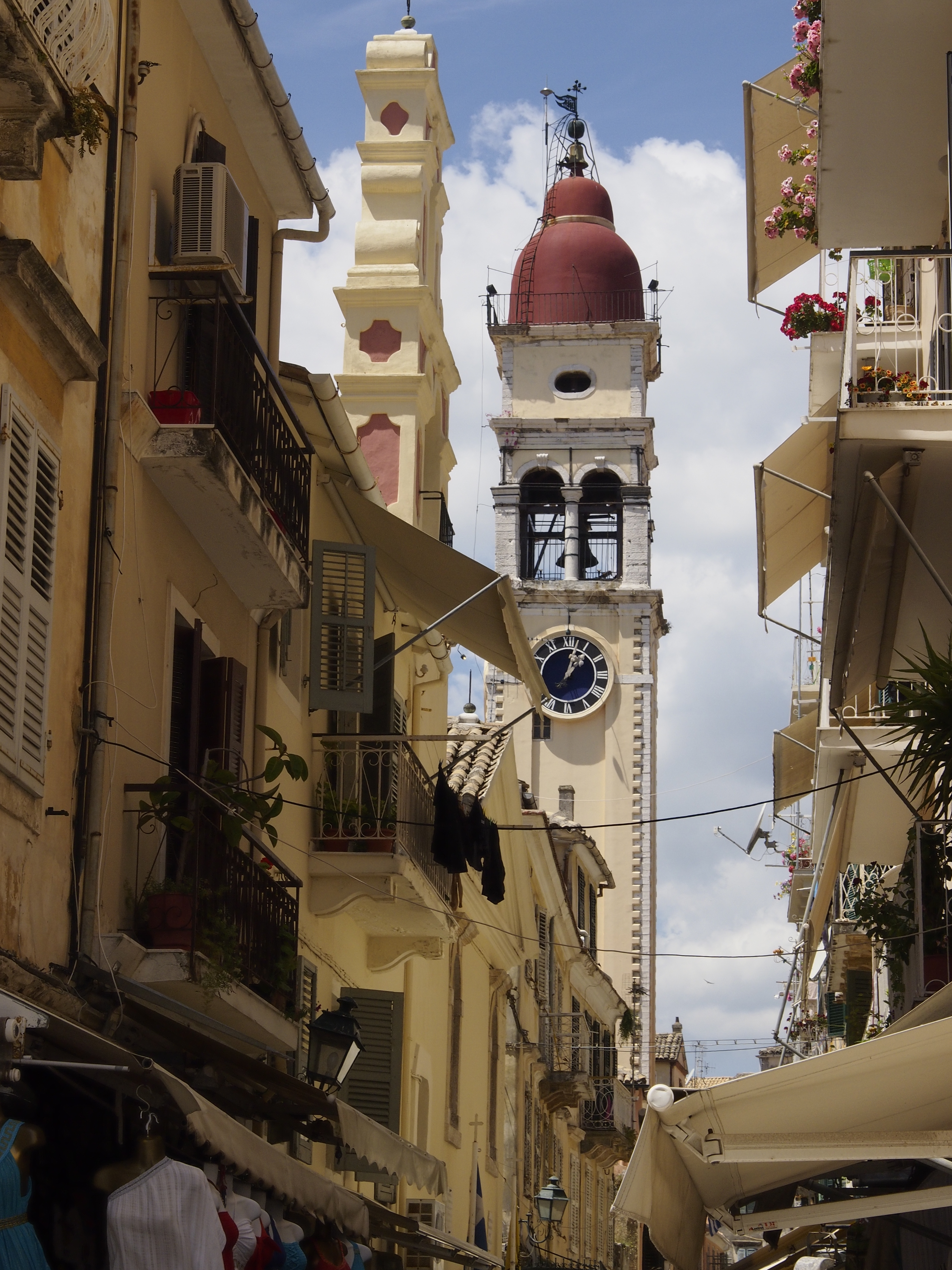
Belltower of the Saint Spyridon Church, patron saint of the city

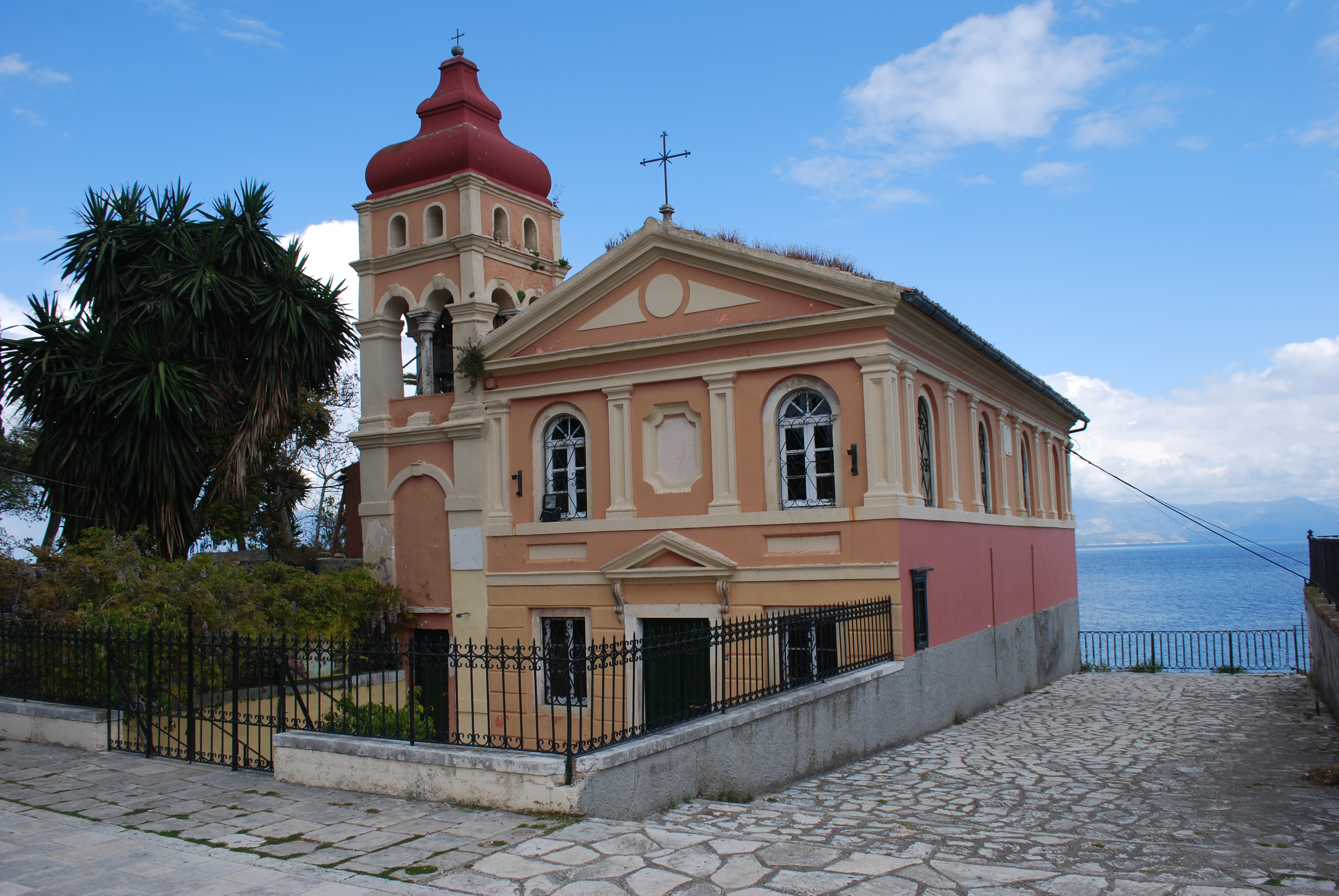
Panagia Mandrakina

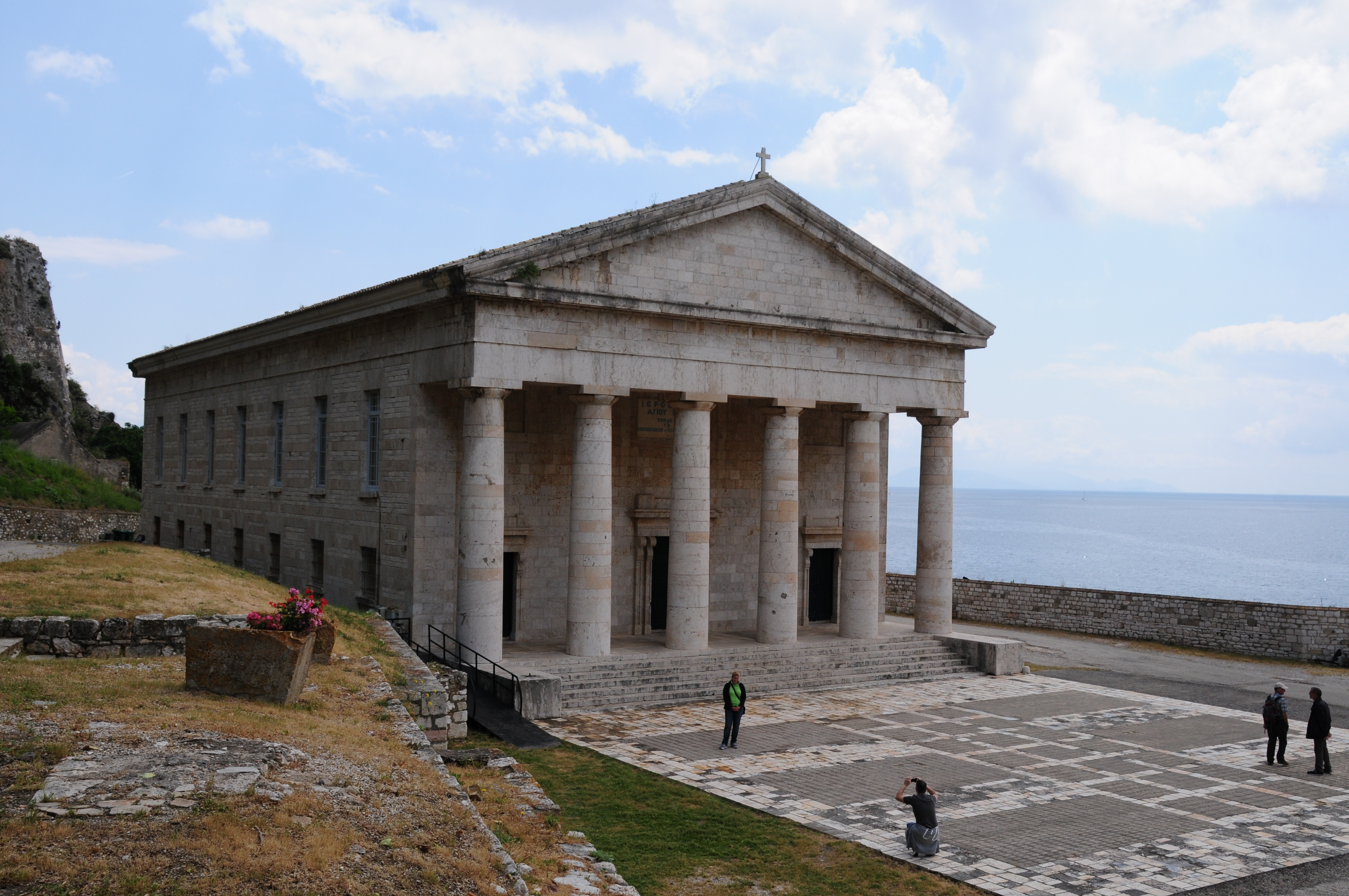
Saint George Temple at the Old Fortress

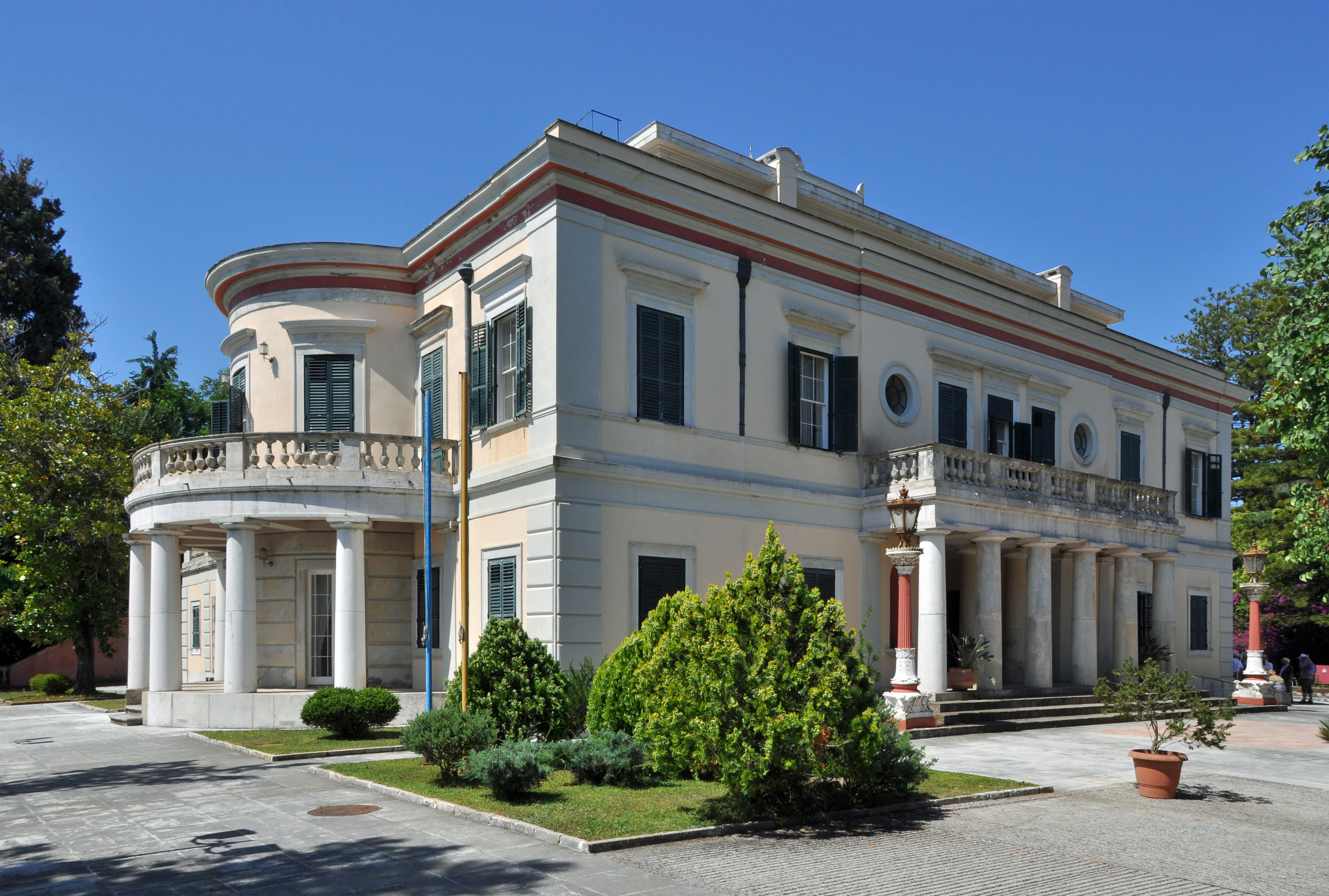
Mon Repos

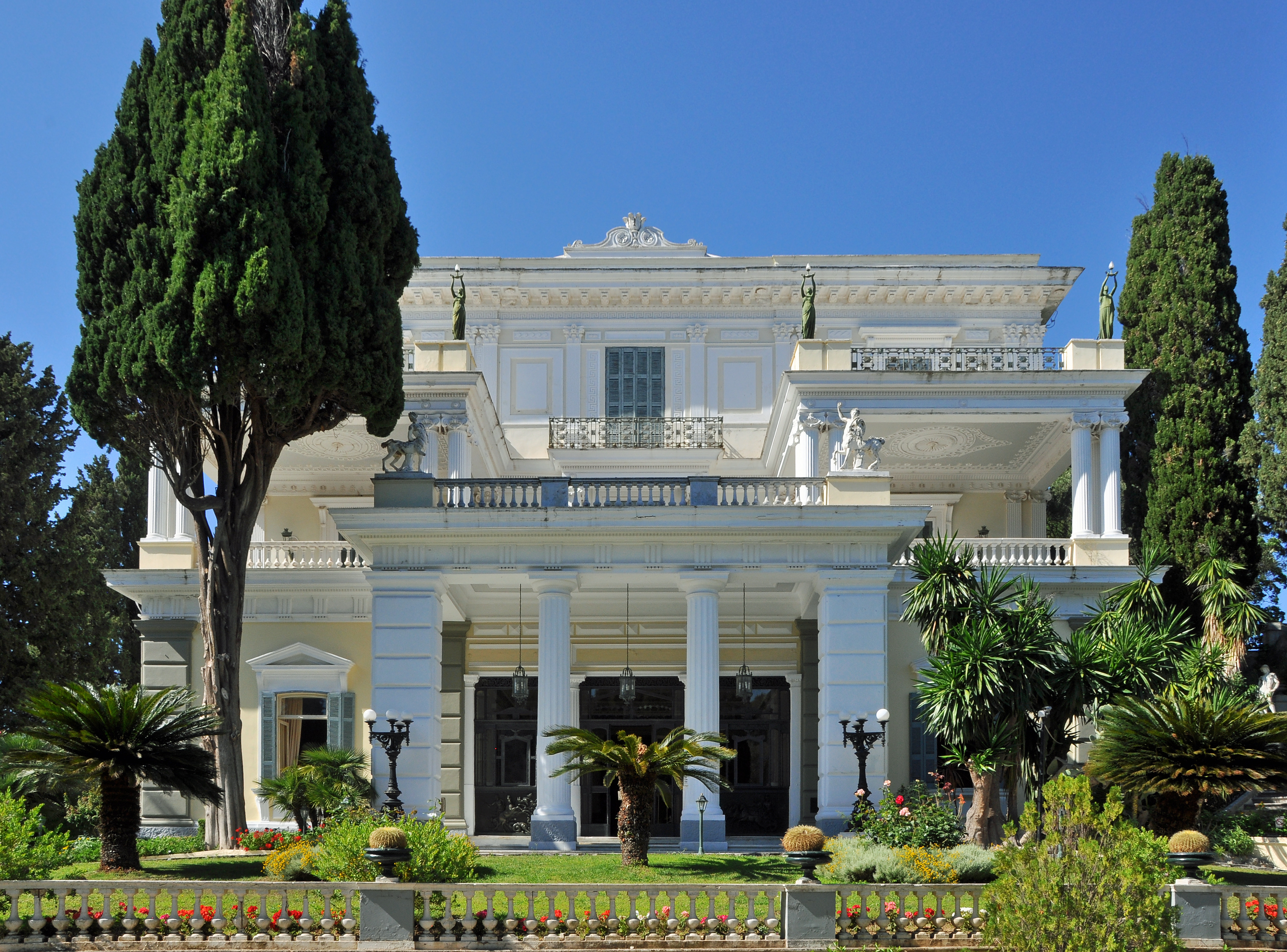
Achilleion façade

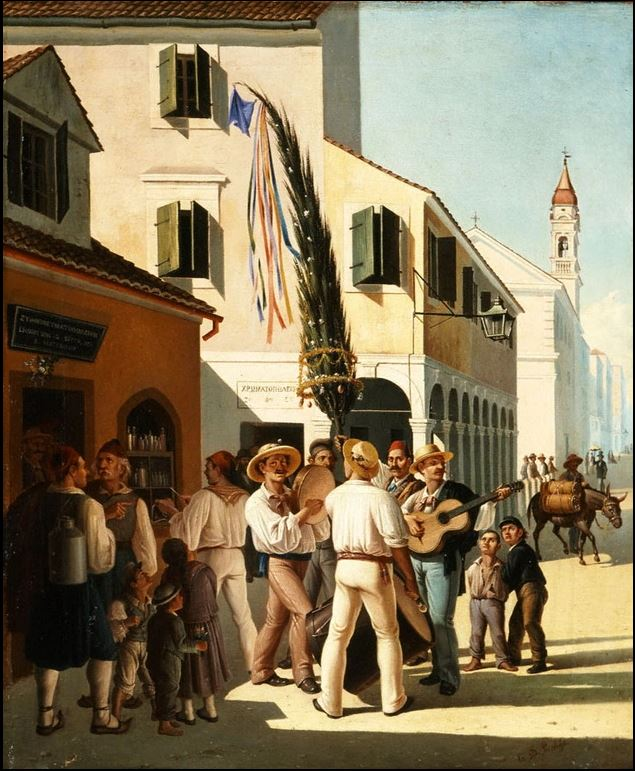
Carnival in Kerkyra by Charalambos Pachis

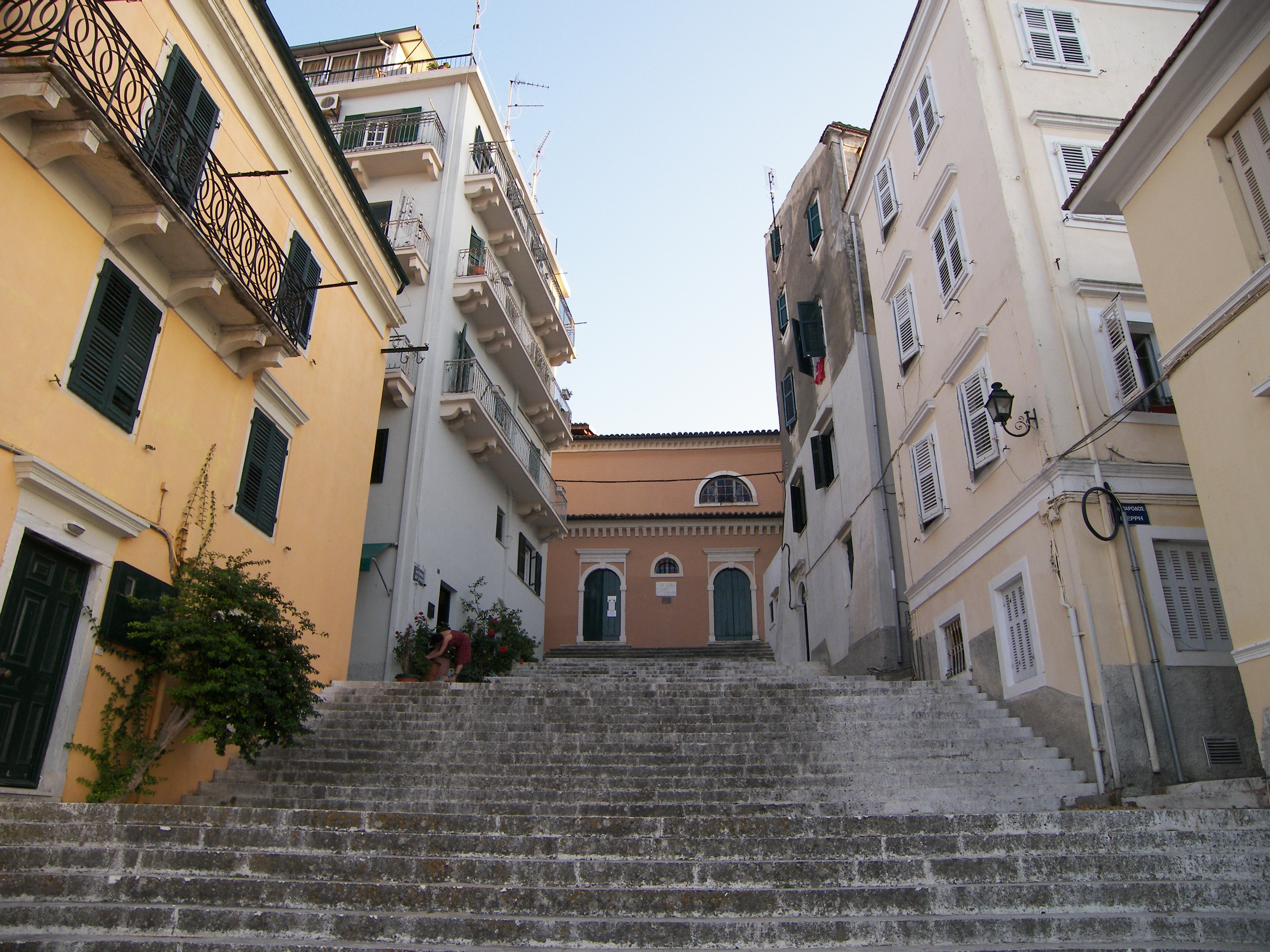
Byzantine Museum of Antivouniotissa

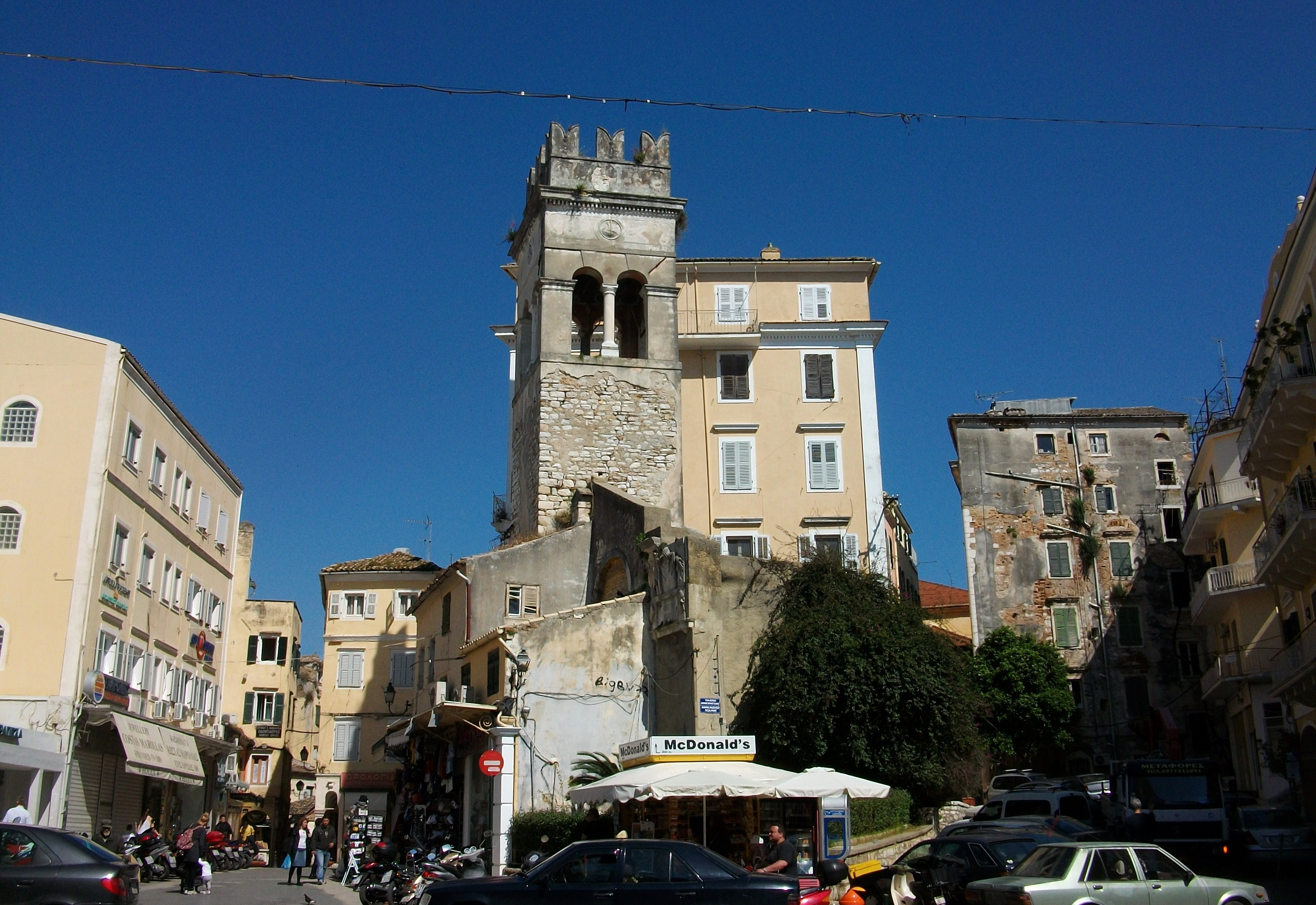
Belltower of Annunziata/Lontsiada Catholic church (Evangelistria)

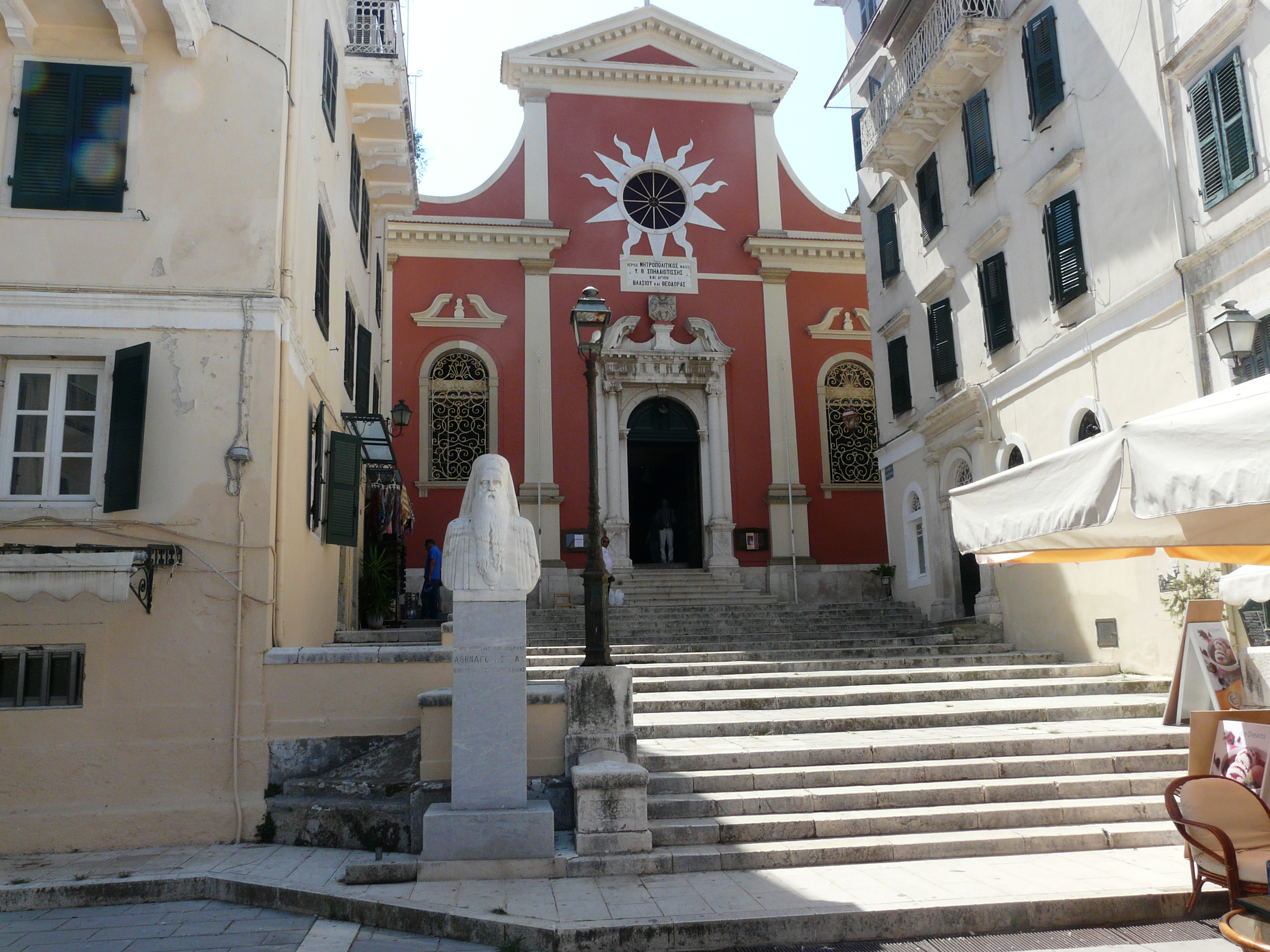
Panagia Spiliotissa Cathedral

== See also ==
- Ionian University
- Septinsular Republic
