= Spyros Rath =

Greek politician (1902–1983)

Spyros Rath (Greek: Σπύρος Ραθ) (1902 - 15 September 1983) was a mayor of the municipality of Corfu, Greece. He was the last elected mayor before the Greek military junta of 1967–1974 replaced him and until 1974 the Local Government was appointed by municipal councils.

In his memory the Municipality of Corfu awards every year the "Rath prize" to young people from Corfu for their artistic or sports performances.

In the Kephalomantouko area of Corfu there is a street on his name.
