= Byzantine Museum of Antivouniotissa =

- Βυζαντινό Μουσείο Αντιβουνιώτισσας
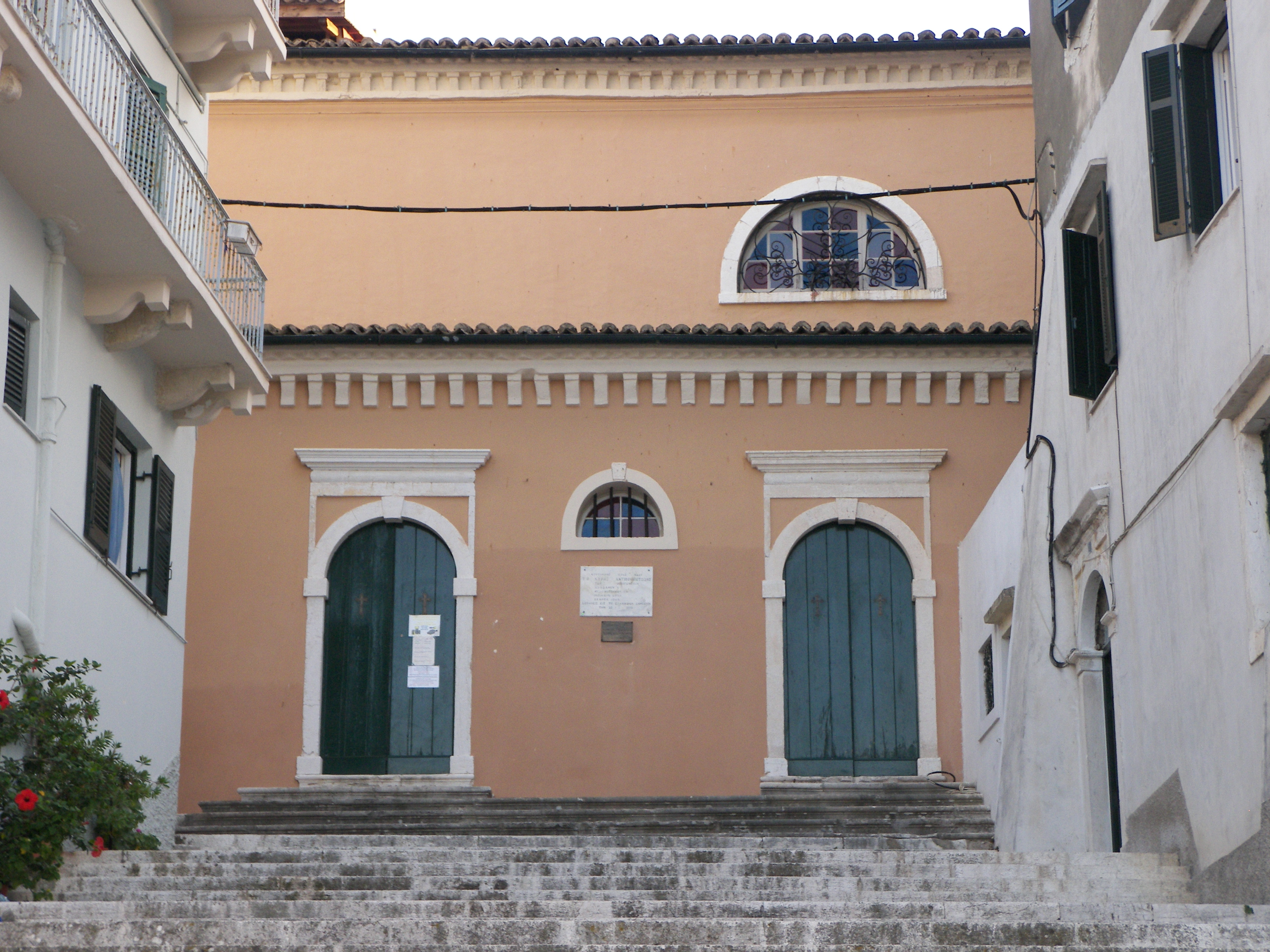
- Entrance of museum
- Established: 1984
- Location: Corfu, Greece
- Coordinates: 39.627439829085624°N 19.92288436849138°E
- Type: Byzantine museum
- Founder: Diocese of Antivouniotissa
- Website: www.antivouniotissamuseum.gr

The Antivouniotissa Museum (Greek: Βυζαντινό Μουσείο Αντιβουνιώτισσας) is a museum of post-Byzantine religious art of the Cretan and early Heptanese schools in Corfu, Greece. It is located in the former church of the Holy Mother of God Antivouniotissa (Greek for facing the mountain)

== The church ==
The church, dedicated to the Holy Mother of God Antivouniotissa, one of the oldest and richest religious monuments on Corfu, was probably built at the end of the 15th century. Since 1984, a rich collection of heirlooms and portable icons is on display in the church of the Antivouniotissa.

The church of Antivouniotissa is an aisleless, timber-roofed basilica in which the particular characteristic of the Corfiote churches of the period are preserved intact: that is, the exonarthex envelopes the church on three of its four sides. The exterior, which has arched doorways and windows, is plain, the only decorative element being a dentilated cornice – a morphology that chimes well with the successful modeling of the volumes. The bell-tower with arched openings at the top, rises in the open courtyard at the East end of the monument.

In contrast with the austere exonarthexes, the interior of the nave is impressive and imposing, and retains a number of features of the so-called Heptanesian Basilica type, such as the high pews, the painted “wall-paper” on the walls, and the decorated ceiling (ourania) which in this case is divided into coffers with elegant gilded wood-carvings. The stone iconostasis is a later structure. The paving slabs in the nave and the exonarthexes are also of stone. The majority of them are tombstones with incised or relief names and coats-of-arms of noblemen, great protopapases (leading clerics), and distinguished Corfiote personalities in general, who were buried here, closely linking the Antivouniotissa with the history of the island.

In 1979, the descendants of the founders, the Mylonopoulos, Alamanos, Rizikaris and Skarpas families, decided to bestow a donation on the church, which has a rich collection of heirlooms and portable icons, on condition that it should become a Museum. In 1984, after the major statics problems of the monument had been solved through urgently necessary restoration work, the then Minister of Culture, Melina Merkouri, inaugurated the Museum, with its rich collection of conserved portable icons and heirlooms. In June 1994, after a second, final phase of restoration work on the church, the Antivouniotissa recovered its old majesty and grandeur and its new display was opened.

== The museum ==
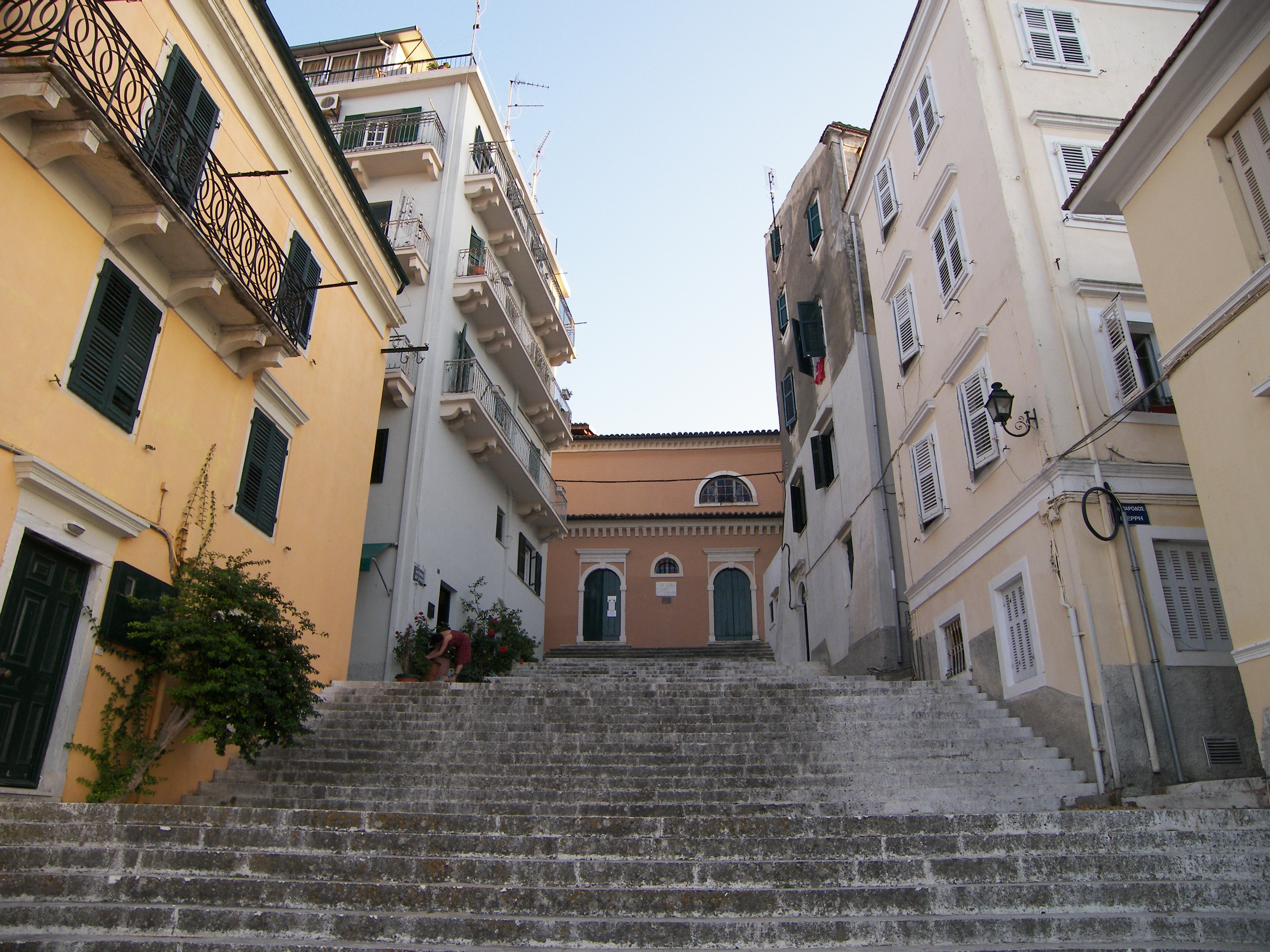
Antivouniotissa Museum

The basic consideration, in both the restoration work and the new display in the Antivouniotissa Museum, was to recreate the monument as a church. On the basis of archive photographs, the nave and the sanctuary reacquired their liturgical character as formed over recent centuries. All liturgical objects were replaced in their proper positions, and the pews and painted “wall-paper” were reconstructed. The narthexes became mainly exhibition areas, in which are displayed the icons from the church, and the larger part of the old collection of icons from the Museum of Asian art of Corfu, account being taken in the exhibition of the chronological, iconographical and stylistic characteristics of the objects.

The collection includes some important items, by both known and anonymous artists, dating from the 15th to the 19th century, and thus gives a full picture of the religious and artistic output during this period on Corfu, as well as the intellectual movement more generally. Like the Ionian Islands, Corfu became a stopping point and place of residence for artists, mainly from the Cretan School, en route from Crete to Venice, particularly after Crete fell to the Ottoman Empire in 1669. This was the birth of the Heptanese School.

This movement of both artists and artistic trends, combined with a dedication to the Orthodox doctrine, Byzantine survivals, and direct contact with the West, led to the creation over the centuries of a high-quality artistic aesthetic and models, not only amongst the locals. The Antivouniotissa Museum, through works by artists from Nicholas Tzafouris, Michael Damaskinos and Emmanuel Lambardos to Emmanuel Tzanes, Victor and Michael Avramis, and others, is fully representative of five centuries of religious artistic expression.

== Gallery ==
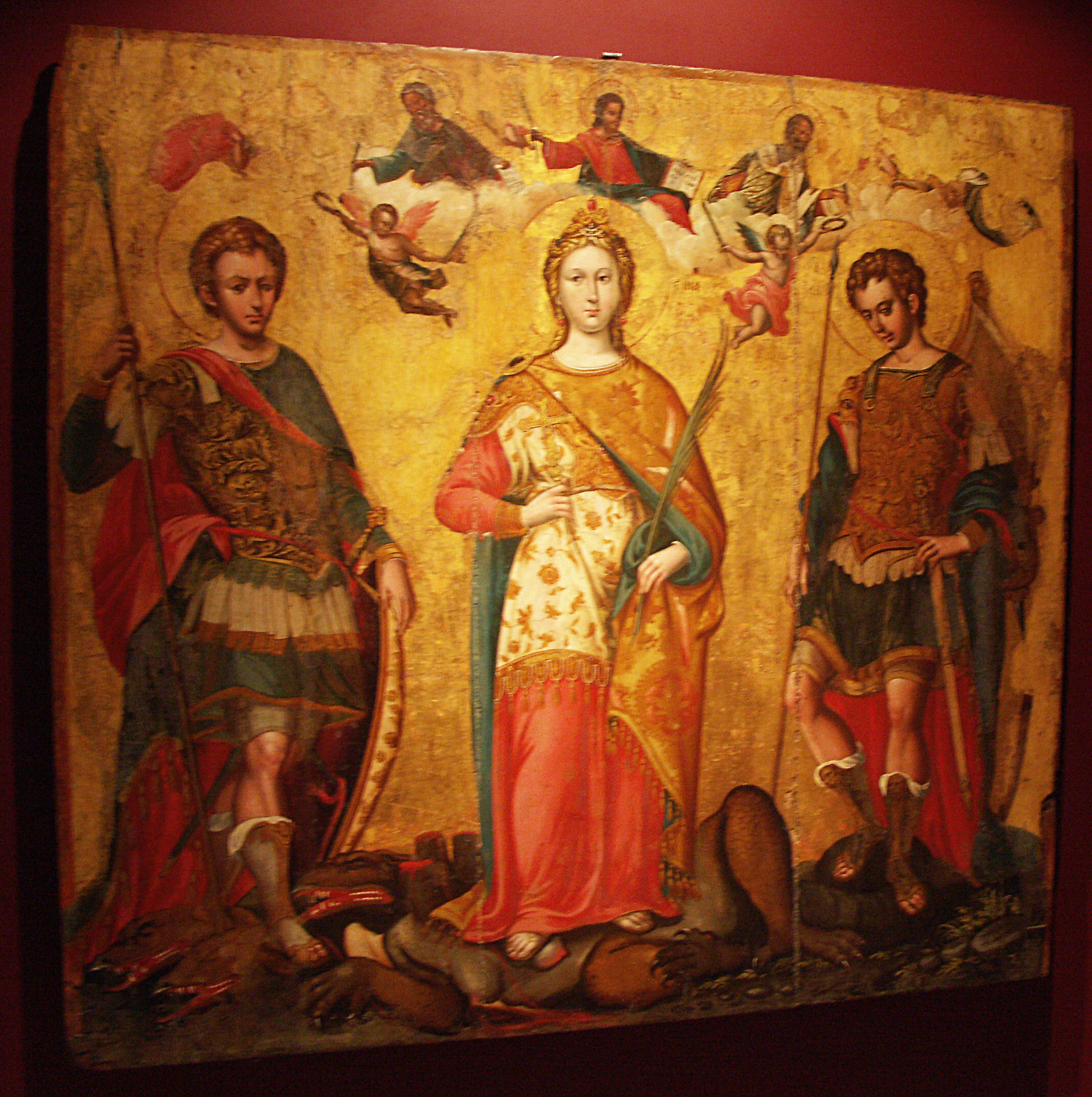
Saints Sergius and Bacchus and Saint Justina of Padua, by Michael Damaskinos, 16th century

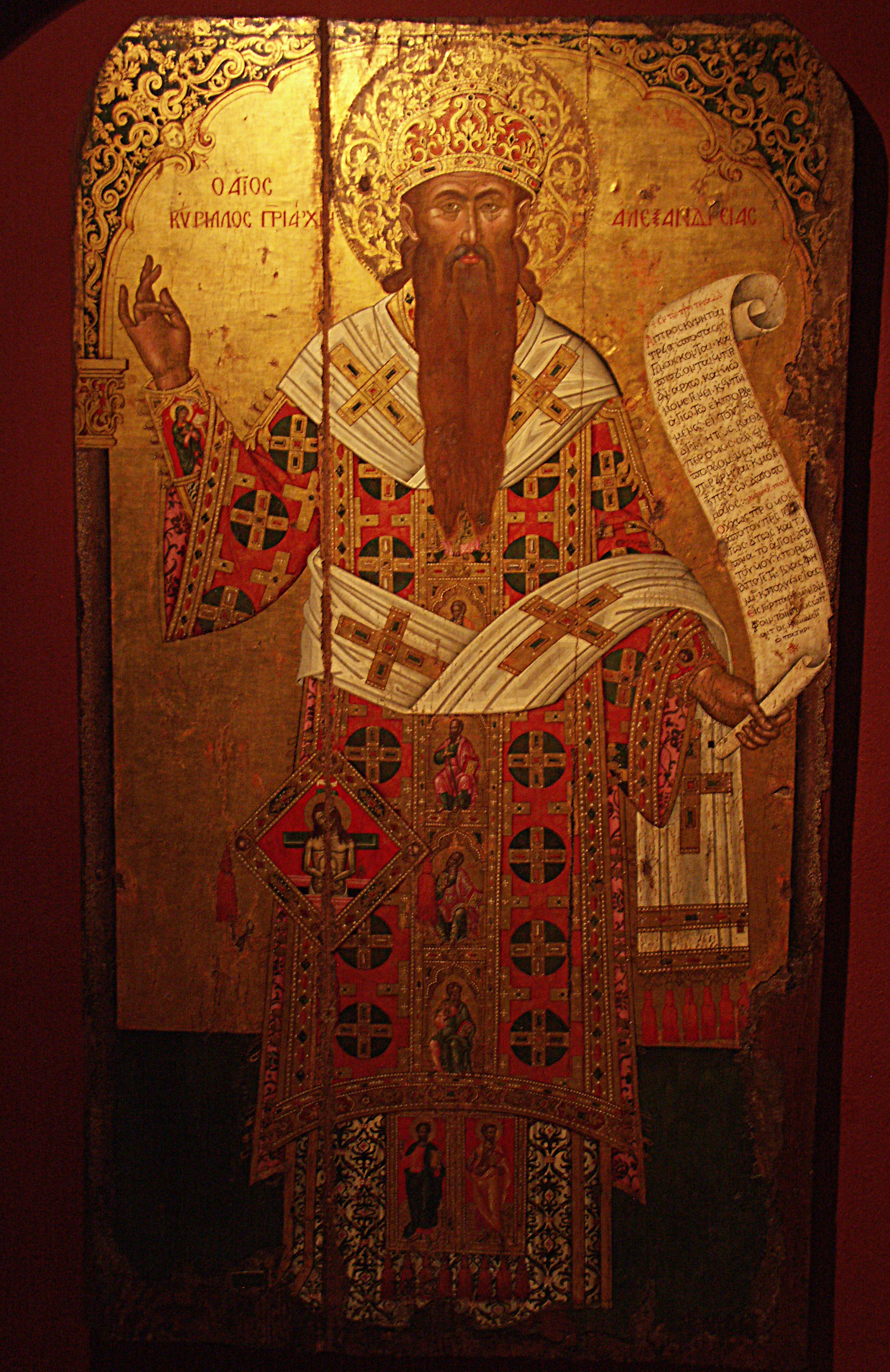
Saint Cyrille d'Alexandrie by Emmanuel Tzanes

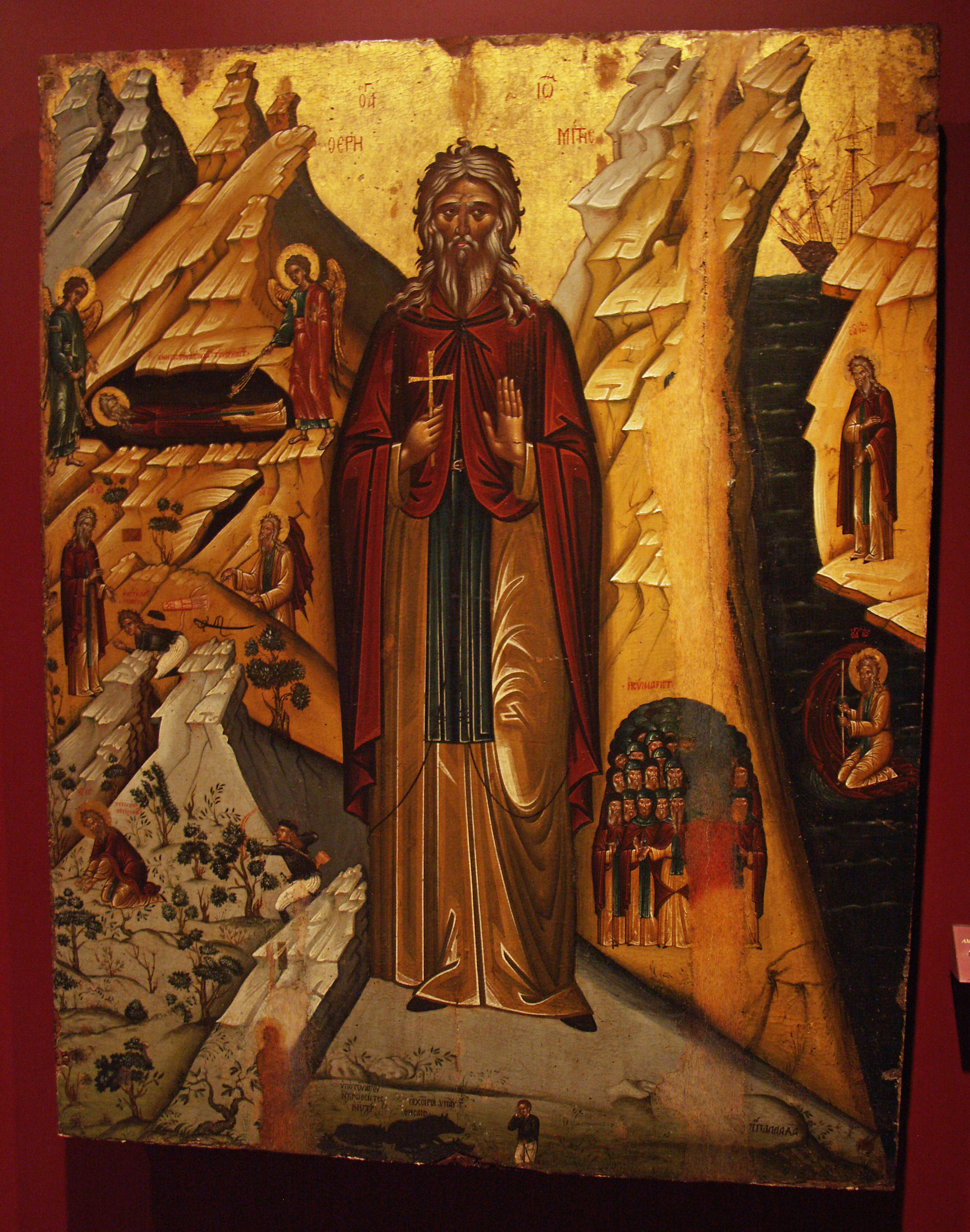
Saint Jean l'Ermite by Jeremiah Palladas

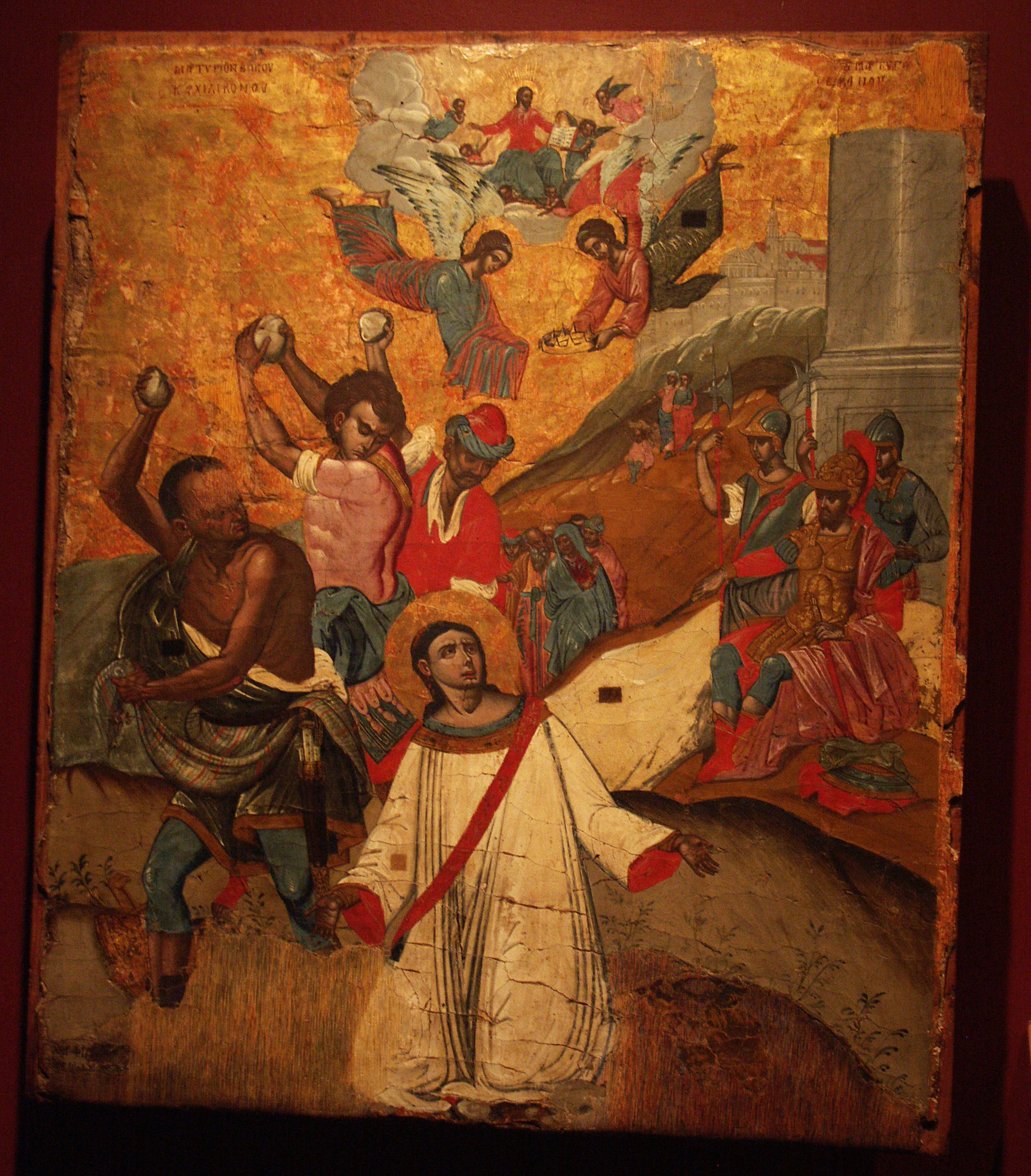
Lapidation de Saint Etienne by Filotheos Skoufos
