= Kanali, Corfu =

Kanali Κανάλι
- Community
- Location within Greece
- Coordinates: 39°36′32″N 19°53′34″E
- Country: Greece
- Administrative region: Ionian Islands
- Regional unit: Corfu
- Municipality: Central Corfu and Diapontian Islands
- Municipal unit: Corfu (city)

Population (2021)
  - Community: 4,768
- Time zone: UTC+2 (EET)
  - Summer (DST): UTC+3 (EEST)

Kanali or Kanalion (Greek: Κανάλι, Κανάλιον) is a town on the island of Corfu, Greece. It is a community of the city of Corfu, and part of the municipality Central Corfu and Diapontian Islands.

== Population ==
Historical population
Year	Pop.	±%
1991	2,684	—
2001	3,593	+33.9%
2011	4,086	+13.7%
2021	4,768	+16.7%
