= Potamos (Corfu) =

Village in Greece

Coordinates: 39°37′25″N 19°52′42″E

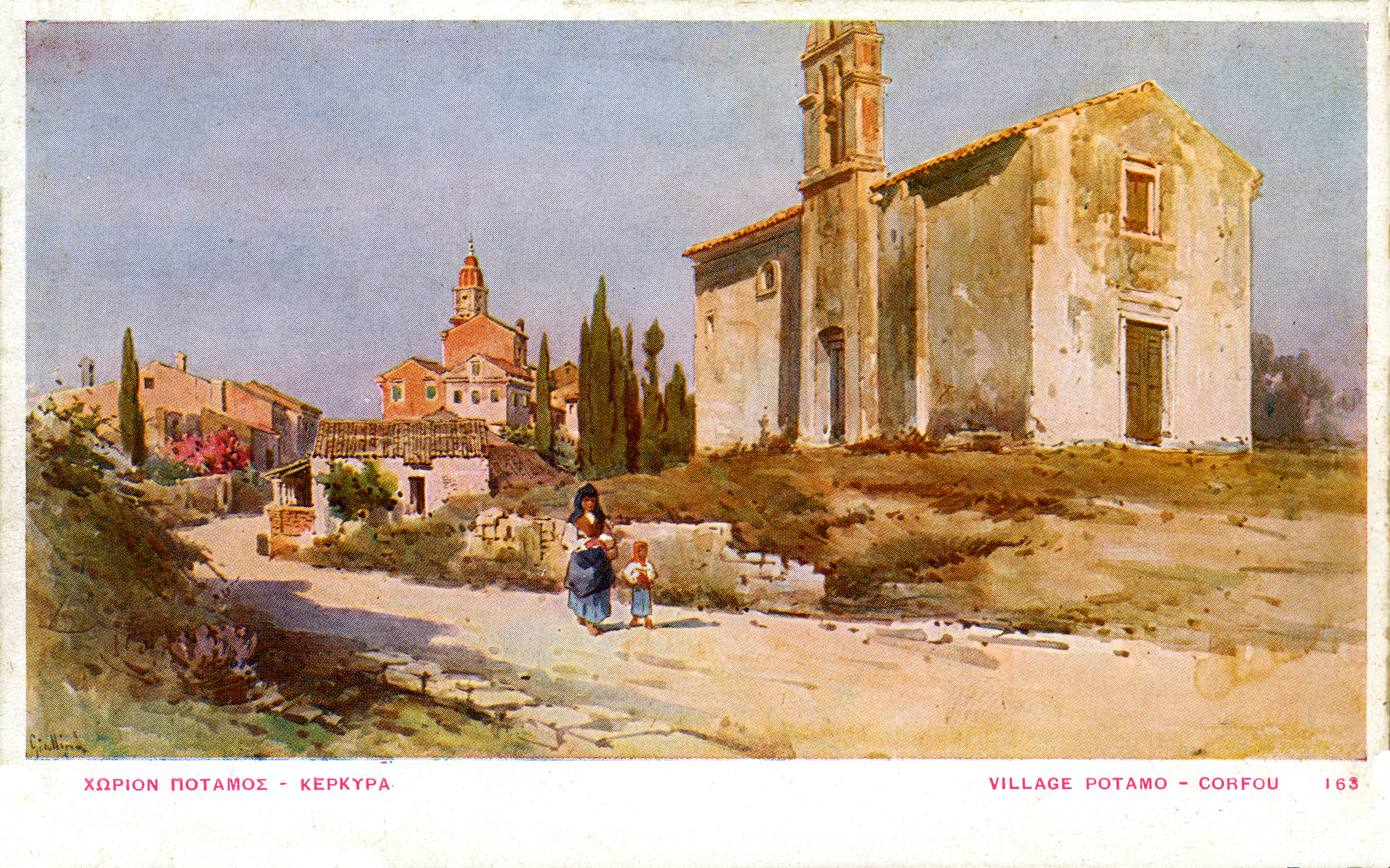
Postcard of Potamos village ca. 1910, based on a painting by Corfiote artist Angelos Giallinas and published by Aspioti-ELKA

Potamos is a Greek town adjacent to the city of Corfu. Potamos was established as a settlement on 28 January 1866 by publication of the decision in the Greek government gazette. On 15 December 1915, it became part of the City of Corfu. In 2019, it was removed from the administrative unit of the municipality of Corfu, and transferred to the municipality of Central Corfu and Diapontia Islands. In 2011, the population of Potamos was 3840.
