= Hellenic Cricket Federation =

Cricket governing body in Greece

- Sport: Cricket
- Abbreviation: HCF
- Founded: 1996
- Affiliation: International Cricket Council
- Affiliation date: 2017 (associate member)
- Regional affiliation: ICC Europe
- Location: Corfu, Greece
- President: Joseph Nikitas
- Secretary: Stylianos Goustis

Official website
- www.cricket.gr
- (Greece)

The Hellenic Cricket Federation (Greek: Ελληνική Ομοσπονδία Κρίκετ) is the governing body of cricket in Greece. The current president is Joseph Nikitas. Greece was accepted into the European Cricket Council (ECC) in 1995. The federation's headquarters are on the island of Corfu where Greek cricket is mainly played. In 2017, it became an associate member of the International Cricket Council.

== History ==
Cricket has been played in Corfu since 1823 but remains a minor sport in Greece, with almost no media coverage around the country. Cricket was brought to Greece by the British who occupied the Ionian Islands for 50 years, leaving in 1864. Most of the players and coaches are Corfu Greeks, but there are also some Pakistanis and Afghanis playing, one max per club eleven in competitions. There are also some Australian Greeks from Melbourne who play. Greece came runners-up in the 2005 European Affiliates Championships that took place August of that year. However the Greek team was relegated to the fourth division in the European Championships, and banned from playing for a year, due to an alleged irregularity as one of the Melbourne Greeks had left behind his Greek passport (the decision was contested by the Hellenic Cricket Federation). In early September 2012 the European Division 2 T20 Championships were held in Corfu. Hellas was captained by former Hampshire wicketkeeper Nic Pothas.

== Clubs ==
Greece has 15 official clubs of which 13 are on Corfu, one is in Athens, and one is in Thessaloniki.

== See also ==
- Cricket in Greece
- Greece national cricket team
