= Greek Men's Cricket Championship =

- Sport: Cricket
- Founded: 1996
- Country: Greece
- Continent: (European Union) Europe
- Most recent champions: Outdoor; AO Phaeax; Indoor; GSK Byron
- Website: www.cricket.gr

The Greek Cricket Championship is the most important domestic competition of cricket in Greece. It is organised by Hellenic Cricket Federation. Every year they are organised two competitions. One indoor championship is organised during winter period and one outdoor championship, during summer period. The clubs of Corfu star in the championship as well as the sport has popularity mostly in Corfu.

== Outdoor championships ==
Season	Champion	Source
2009	GSK Byron	
2010		
2011	GSK Byron	
2012		
2013	AO Phaeax	
2014	AO Phaeax	

== Indoor championships ==
Season	Champion	Source
2009		
2010	GSK Byron	
2011	AO Phaeax	
2012		
2013	GSK Byron	
2014	GSK Byron	
