= Kerkyraikos G.S. =

Multi sports club in Greece

Kerkyraikos G.S. (Κερκυραϊκός Γ.Σ.)
- Sport: Multisport
- Colors: Red and Blue
- Website: kerkyraikos.gr

Kerkyraikos Gymnastikos Syllogos (Greek: Κερκυραϊκός Γυμναστικός Σύλλογος) is a Greek multi sports club based on Corfu (city). They are the older sports club of the island of Corfu, founded in 1893. Their emblem is the Discobolus and their colors are blue and red.

Currently they maintain sport departments of track and field, basketball, and cricket with plans also for football.
