= British intervention in Spanish American independence =

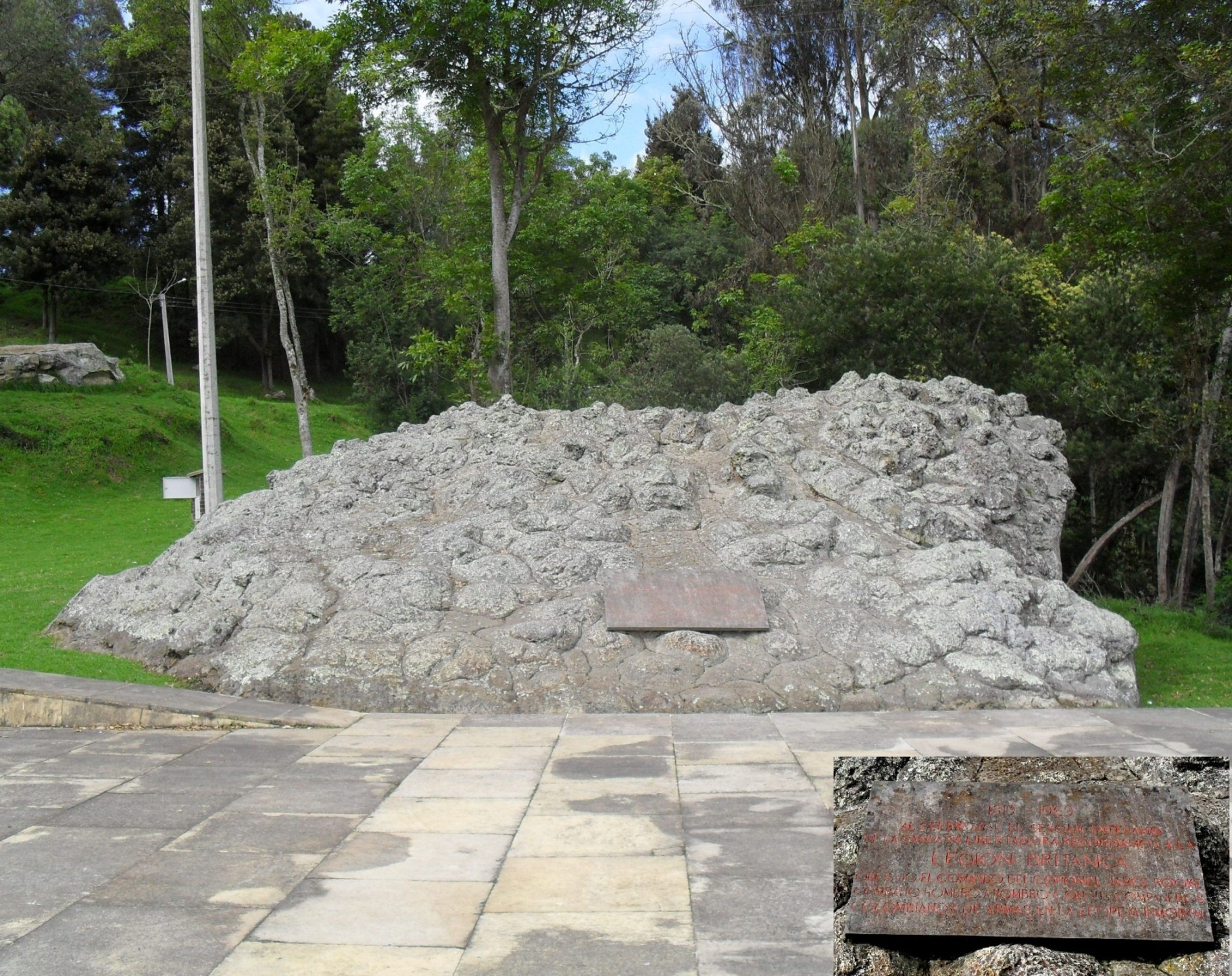
- Monument to the British Legions who fought at the Battle of Boyacá on August 7, 1819
- Date: 1815–1819
- Location: United Kingdom, Spanish Empire
- Type: Interventionism
- Cause: Spanish American wars of independence
- Motive: Colonialism and mercantilism
- Target: Soldiers and sailors recruited in the United Kingdom for insurgency. Sales of warships, weapons and ammunition.
- Participants: British volunteers
- End of the event: Foreign Enlistment Act 1819

Britain's role in the Spanish American wars of independence combines the military, political and diplomatic routes adopted by them, as well as its merchants and private citizens during the conflict. Britain wanted to see an end to Spanish colonialism in the Americas but at the same time wanted to keep her as an ally in post-Napoleonic Europe. British support for the Spanish American revolutionaries was essentially a covert role with both private and state involvement.

As a combined form of unofficial private enterprise, the British were able to use their merchants in the hope of cutting the Spanish monopoly. Arms, supplies, loans, ships, and hired soldiers and sailors were then sent to support the revolutionaries. Spanish aid was eventually cut off from their colonies with the clever use of diplomacy, and with the Royal Navy in command of the oceans. All these factors combined were decisive in the struggle for independence of South American republics.

== Background ==
The Kingdom of Great Britain had long harboured ambitions in South America, particularly in regards to trade. The South Sea Company was granted trading concessions in South America during the reign of Queen Anne, in January 1711 under the Treaty of Utrecht. Following this attempts had been made by the British to establish a foothold in South America; most however failed, notably in 1741 at the Battle of Cartagena de Indias during the War of Jenkins' Ear.

By 1783 Britain had lost her Thirteen Colonies of North America, which had become independent with the support of both France and Spain. Britain then looked to restore her loss of prestige, and expand its influence in the Americas.

In 1789 the Nootka Crisis began – a dispute in Nootka Sound on Vancouver Island, and war between Britain against both Spain and France looked to be a foregone conclusion. The revolutionary Francisco de Miranda made use of the crisis to present to some British cabinet ministers his ideas about the independence of Spanish territories in America. A plan was therefore put in motion, but both Spain and France however were forced to back down against Britain following successful diplomacy and mobilisation of the Royal Navy. Miranda's proposal was therefore cancelled, but the idea bore fruit for a future conflict; the politician Nicholas Vansittart implemented the 'Vansittart Plan in 1795, with the aim of an expedition striking Buenos Aires and from then on to Callao via the Andes. This however was put on hold following Britain's coalition with Spain against Revolutionary France.

The following year however Great Britain was at war with both Spain and the French First Republic in the French Revolutionary and Napoleonic Wars. The Spanish government recognised that the United Kingdom was the main threat to their colonies in Spanish America.

=== Maitland plan ===
In 1800, the 'Vansittart Plan' was improved by Major General Thomas Maitland and so was renamed the Maitland Plan. The plan was more bolder - made up of six objectives titled Plan to capture Buenos Aires and Chile, and then emancipate Peru and Quito from the Spanish Empire. The plan was put into place – in 1806 and 1807, when the United Kingdom invaded the River Plate. The first invasion had several contingents, totalling about 1,700 soldiers. This was followed up with a second of up to 14,000 men, twenty warships and ninety transports. They initially occupied Buenos Aires and later Montevideo but were defeated by the Spanish colonial militias. As these victories were gained with minimal help from Spain, they provided a catalyst for the growth of discontent with Spanish rule in the River Plate. The plan was put on hold again as events on the European continent took shape.

=== Change of alliances ===
On May 2, 1808, however Napoleon Bonaparte's army entered Spain which led to the Peninsular War. This reconfigured the alliances between the European powers. King Ferdinand VII stayed in Bayonne and Joseph Bonaparte took the Spanish throne, which broke the state pact between France and Spain, previously installed, by the family pacts of the Bourbon kings. The United Kingdom, on the other hand, was preparing to fight French forces in the Iberian Peninsula, and thus Britain and Spain became allies. The Spanish fleet however which had been left crippled after the Battle of Trafalgar had a few sea worthy going ships. These remaining ships together with a controversial purchase of Russian ships, would be the only naval link with the overseas colonies in that period. George Canning during his time as Foreign Office secretary became deeply involved in the affairs of Spain, Portugal and South America.

A weakened Spain distracted and virtually cut off from her colonies, meant that insurrections in South America began to surface soon after the Peninsula War began. In addition, Spanish treasure fleets carrying tax revenues from the Americas – were interrupted, bankrupting Spain. The British meanwhile improved their own colonial interests by expanding; with the capture of French and Dutch colonies.

== Military support ==
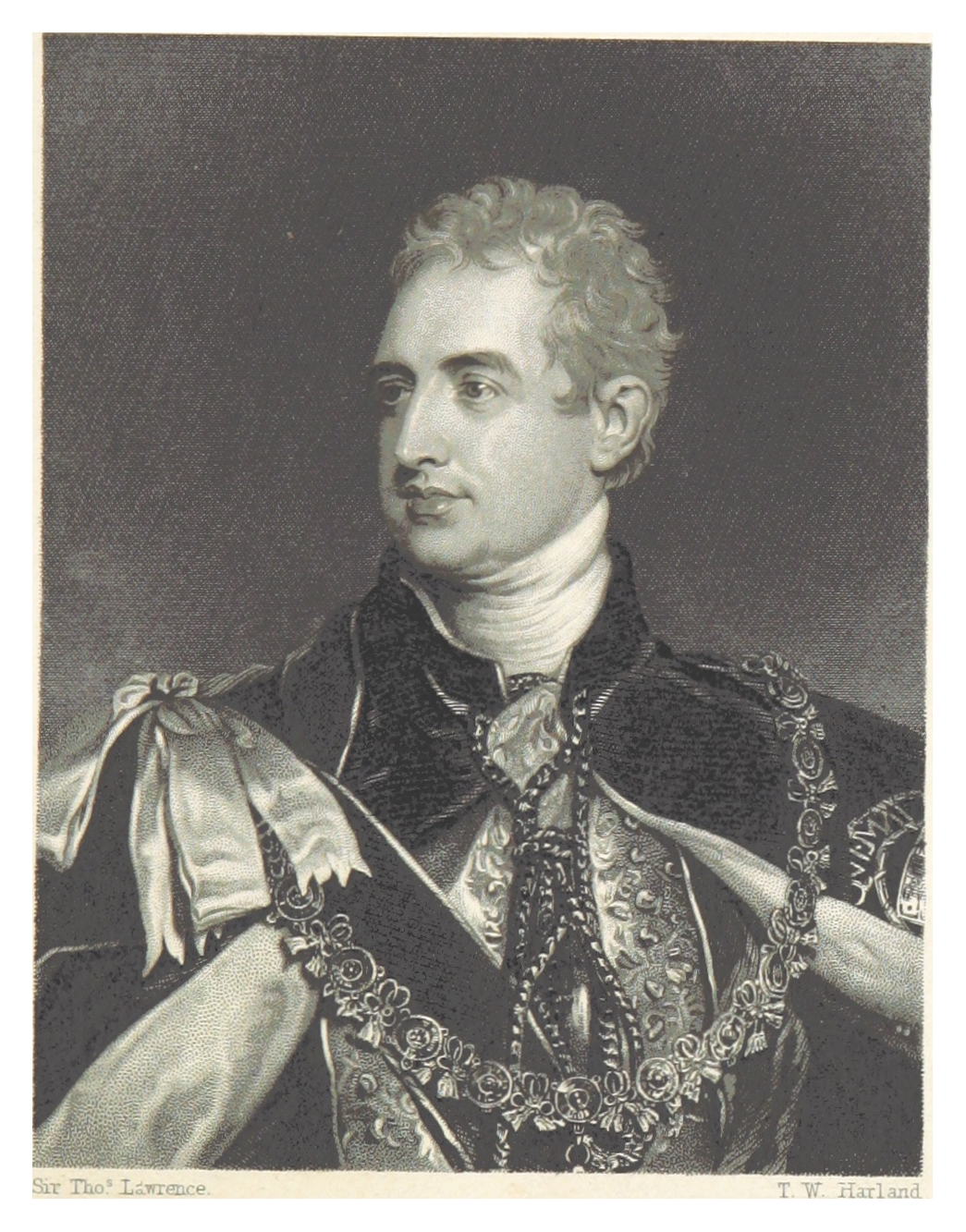
Lord Castlereagh

The Maitland Plan meanwhile was still a British objective - José de San Martín, the prime leader of the southern part of South America's struggle for independence, was introduced to the plan (during his stay in London in 1811) by revolutionary leader Francisco de Miranda and James Duff. San Martín took the Maitland Plan as a blueprint for the movements necessary to defeat the Spanish army in South America; in particular with the last five objectives of the plan which included the Crossing of the Andes. The following year, the separation of the River Plate was assured once the fall of Montevideo was achieved.

=== Violation of neutrality ===
The United Kingdom had declared neutrality which was the policy of Lord Castlereagh's government. This was to keep Spain separate from the French post-Napoleonic period, which was feared would break the European balance of power whilst the British wanted to preserve their colonial interests around the world. Consequently, the United Kingdom rejected the requests of the revolutionary commissioners to recognize their independence but would offer military and financial support allowed under British law. The British declined any agreement with the Spanish government that would ensure the continual rule of their South American territories, partly in order to monopolise the important emerging markets of South America.

In 1817 a recruitment programme began in Great Britain of military personnel for service of the Revolutionary forces in South America. During the next two years, the government of London had to overcome the demands of the Spanish government for the extensive enlistment of British officers, sailors and soldiers. London counted on the British public for sympathy and support for the recruitment to the patriot cause, which would help alleviate the 500,000 British, Irish, and German ex-soldiers after the fall of Napoleon. A large number of these veterans of the Napoleonic wars were thus unemployed.

However, the international obligations of a declared policy of neutrality, were inconsistent with the large number of British combatants taken from the United Kingdom and its colonies to fight against Spain's own colonies in South America. Before 1817 a few British combatants had participated in early phases of the struggle in different parts of South America, in mostly isolated - but still relevant - actions such as the Battle of Martín García. Nevertheless, the systematic recruitment of forces to fight for Simón Bolívar began in April 1817. The circumstances were very favourable - with the help of Venezuelan agents as Luis López Méndez and adventurers such as Gregor MacGregor, British officers and sergeants were recruited forming their own regiments.

This violation of neutrality was protested by the Spanish commissioners led by Joaquin Campuzano in July of that year. The Foreign Office however denied any illegal act whilst Castlereagh tried to minimize the problem, assuring the Spanish that these were specific cases, without employment. At the beginning of September, many active officers requested permission to travel to South America, and the commander in chief of the army, the Duke of York, raised his doubts about the convenience of allowing those officers to proceed with the embarkation. Castlereagh, imposed the distinction between "prohibit" and "not grant permission", in the contrary opinion of George Canning. Castlereagh referred to his lawmakers, who said that although the foreign service had been banned, the old laws did not seem applicable to unrecognised states such as in South America. The stubborn attitude of Ferdinand VII actually helped the British play their hand. He refused to consider making any concessions to the Revolutionaries which caused the British government to regard with more friendly eyes the prospect of South American Independence.

During September, the recruitment was already well-known and public, and newspapers gave details of troops and war material in ships destined towards South America. The protests of the Spanish ambassador, Duke of San Carlos became more insistent. Castlereagh refused to deal with a royal proclamation against enlistment in Britain, which would leave the insurgents helpless. He claimed that this prohibition was irreconcilable with British public opinion, without introducing, at the same time, mediation and free trade in Britain with the Spanish colonies.

=== Arms trade ===
After 1815 this changed dramatically; with the war in Europe over, the revolutionaries were helped by arms and ammunition supplied to them from the United Kingdom and its colonies. Thus began the creation and equipping of new regular patriotic armies. With Britain's complete control of the seas and her colonies in the Caribbean, notably Jamaica and Trinidad, this made arms trafficking far easier to accomplish. The large surplus of arms left over from the Napoleonic war by Britain meant that these were cheap and readily available. British merchants both in the Caribbean and in Europe gave loans and supplies that enabled the South American revolutionaries to secure the means to carry out further campaigns. As a result, British merchants cut the monopolies held by the Spanish elite. With the increase in merchants came an influx of new ideas and new people from Europe, including academics and artisans and tradesmen. With the increase in Europeans across the whole of South America, Britain's goal to increase trade had influenced a continent's fight for independence.

Arms trafficking 1815–25
Type of weapon	Image	Quantity
Muskets		704,104
Pistols		100,637
Gunflints		35,617,864
Musket balls		4,508 tons
Cannonballs		10,254 tons
Sabres		209,864

=== Terrestrial War in South America ===
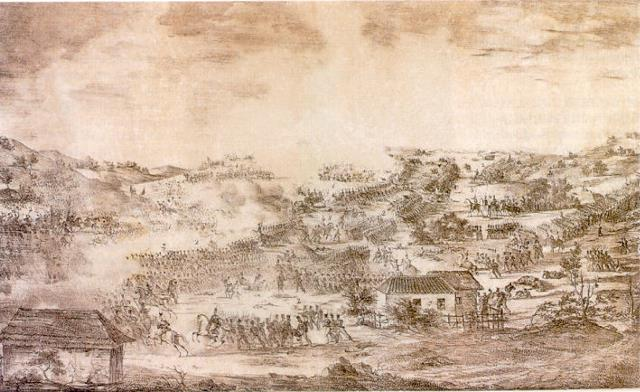
Battle of Boyacá, 1819 - the British Legion played a crucial part in Bolivar's victory over Spanish forces.

From 1817, recruitment for service in South America took place in the United Kingdom. Many were veterans of the Napoleonic and colonial British wars and left their country to fight for Bolivar. The British Legions were composed of the 1st British Legion, the 2nd British Legion and the Irish Legion. They formed the battalions of infantry Albion, Carabobo and Rifles, regiments of cavalry like the Hussars, although their members also fought in other South American units.

The units of the Legion used their own banners, such as the Union Flag for the English, or in the case of the Irish Legion a green flag with the clàrsach, symbol of Ireland.

The British Legions were to become an important part of Bolívar's army. They played a pivotal role in the Battle of Vargas Swamp on July 25, 1819. Bolivar credited them with the victory at the subsequent Battle of Boyacá on August 7, 1819, saying "those soldier-liberators are the men who deserve these laurels" and awarded with the 'Order of the Liberator' one of the rare occasions during the war when this decoration was bestowed onto an entire unit. At the Battle of Carabobo Thomas Ildeston Farriar, at the head of the British rifles, contributed decisively to the patriot triumph. Bolivar described the Legions and all who served in them as "the saviours of my country". As a reward for their service, they were given the Carabobo battle honour, and all its personnel rewarded with the Liberators' Star by Bolívar himself, 20 days after the battle.

With independence for Colombia and Venezuela secure, the Legions took part in the march across the Andes south and next fought at the Battle of Pichincha in May 1822, which secured independence for Ecuador. They also took part of the last major campaign of the Independence wars in 1824, culminating in the battles of Junín and Ayacucho in Peru, which marked the end of the Spanish rule in South America. The British Legions fought until the end of the wars, their number much depleted. Nonetheless, for a long time they were largely forgotten to history.

Other British and Irish soldiers joined the ranks of Bolivar's forces. Two most notable officers were William Miller, whose cavalry led the decisive charge at the Battle of Junin in 1824 and Francis Burdett O'Connor, who later became chief of staff to Antonio José de Sucre.

=== Chile and the Pacific Ocean ===
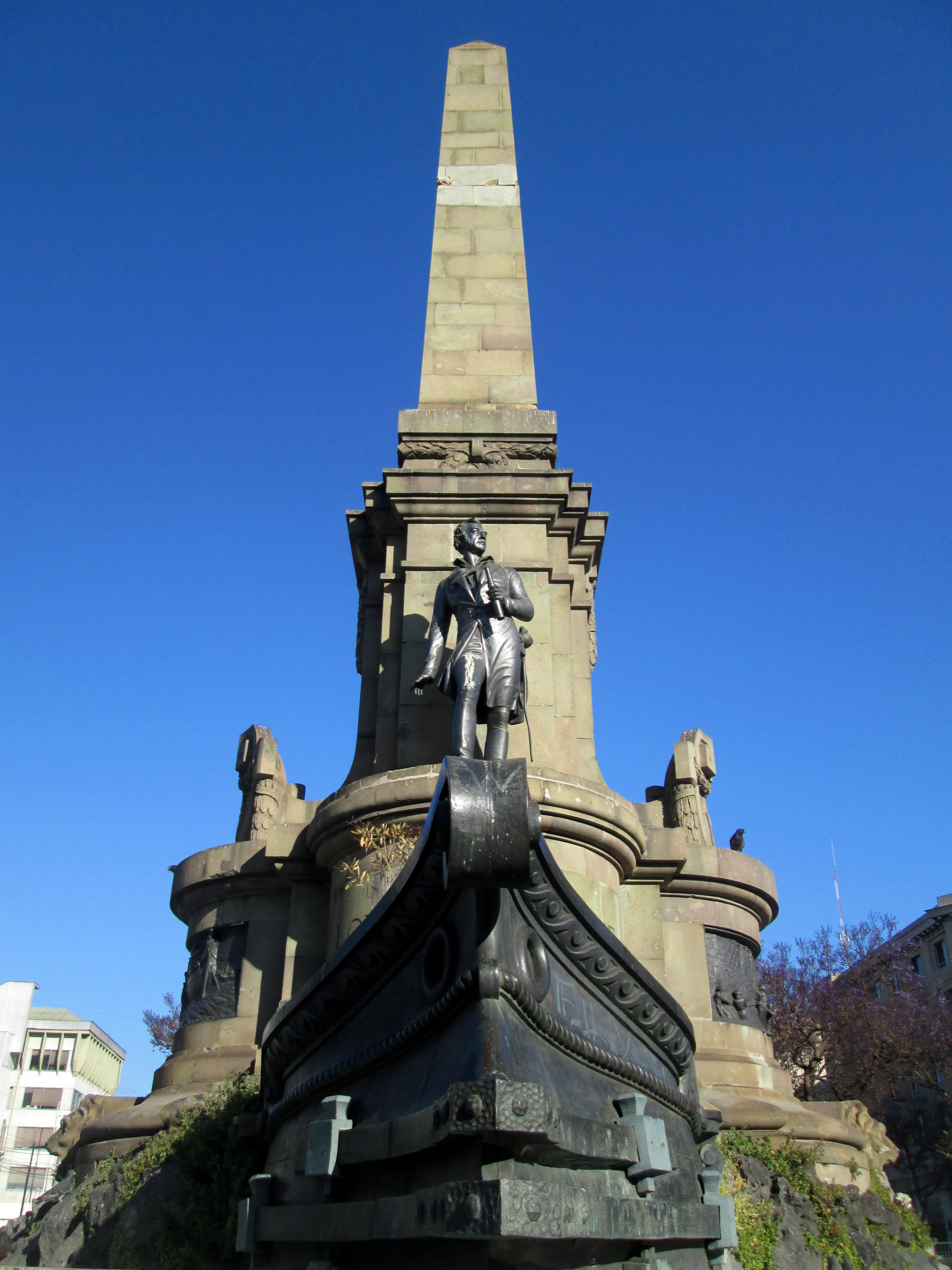
Statue of Lord Cochrane in Valparaíso, Chile

After the end of the Napoleonic Wars, the British Royal Navy had a huge number of warships — approximately 713. With the needs of a European post-war economy the United Kingdom was forced to demobilize most of these ships, with 134 ships remaining by 1820. The rest were sold to individuals, and companies with about 250 warships available to the insurgent governments, carrying the most modern weapons of the time. In addition, many British sailors and captains also went into the service of those ships to South America. One of those ships and captains was John Illingworth, commanding the Rosa de los Andes, classified as a sixth-rate warship by the Royal Navy. This ship, hired by the revolutionary government of Chile for the naval campaigns of independence, had on board the most famous Royal Naval sailor of the time — Scotsman Lord Thomas Cochrane. He arrived in Chile in 1818, the language and laws governing the vessel were determined by the nationality of its captain. When Cochrane was sent to command the Chilean fleet, he decided to remove the rest of the Chilean sailors as he distrusted them. Instead, he replaced them with British or North American officers so that the squadron was governed under British laws with only English being spoken.

The navy list in 1818 -the year that Cochrane arrived in Chile- was dominated by British names, and in 1820 the majority of the fifty officers, and 1,600 sailors in the new Chilean Navy were from Britain.

Working in coordination with Chilean leader Bernardo O'Higgins, Cochrane and his fleet which contained many Britons, blockaded and raided the coasts of Chile, as he had done so successfully with those of France and Spain.

Cochrane's greatest achievement was the capture of the forts of Valdivia on 4 February 1820. The seizure effectively ended the last vestiges of Spanish power in mainland Chile. A vast haul of military plunder was taken.

Under the orders of General José de San Martín, Cochrane blockaded the coast of Peru in support of the campaign for independence. He conveyed the Liberation Army from Valparaíso and disembarked 100 miles southeast of Lima which was liberated the following year. On 5 November, Cochrane working with another former Royal Navy officer Martin George Guisse managed to capture the Spanish frigate Esmeralda, the most powerful Spanish ship in South America within the port of Callao and was renamed Valdivia for the Chilean Navy.

Cochrane then attempted to find other Spanish ships and after a pursuit of five months, he blockaded them in the port of Guayaquil. They surrendered to the authorities of the port, after which he left Chilean service in November 1822.

Guisse and other British officers including John Illingworth nevertheless carried on the fight and took part in the final campaign in the Peruvian war of Independence which saw the conquest of Callao from the Spanish by 23 January 1826.

== Diplomacy ==
In the face of Spanish diplomatic pressure, Castlereagh supported all his action based on the previous British law. This affirmed that he could only open proceedings against convicts in British courts, which prohibited service abroad, in favour of a prince, state or potentate. The prosecutors did not believe that the Revolutionaries fitted any of those categories, since they were not recognized states. The Lord Chancellor, Earl of Eldon, was consulted on this which held the view that rebel governments could only be considered as a sovereign subject before the British courts, when their sovereignty has been recognized by the British government. For Castlereagh, this placed his government in a dilemma against public opinion, since it made Britain's neutrality impossible, either by recognizing an independence prematurely, or accusing the British of helping the insurgents. Therefore, he concluded that a new law was required, but deferred, since it was not convenient to discuss it publicly in the parliament of the United Kingdom in 1818, while the war had not been yet been decided in favour with the potential possibility of mediation.

Foreign Enlistment Act 1819
- Act of Parliament
- Parliament of the United Kingdom
- Long title: An Act to Prevent the Enlisting or Engagement of His Majesty’s Subjects to Serve in Foreign Service, and the Fitting out or Equipping, in his Majesty's Dominions, Vessels for Warlike Purposes Without His Majesty's Licence.
- Citation: 59 Geo. 3. c. 69

Dates
- Royal assent: 3 July 1819

Status: Repealed

The decisive years of the 1817 and 1818 war ended favourably with patriotic governments. Finally, a bill was presented in Parliament on May 13, 1819, to prohibit the enlistment or commitment of individuals to serve abroad or equipment for military purposes, without the license, and passed as the Foreign Enlistment Act 1819 (59 Geo. 3. c. 69). By this time however around 10,000 men from the British isles had served in South America; of these approximately 6,500 had served in the South American Armies and 3,500 in the Navies. In addition to the enlistment ban other clauses were made; provisions for the trial, detention of ships carrying recruits and armament of warships for foreign service. What's more despite the law being passed there was no intention of ever enforcing it.

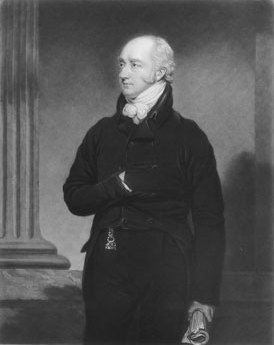
George Canning

San Carlos communicated to Madrid that he believed that formality and appearance were maintained only to gain time. Castlereagh's greatest achievement was to settle a deal with the European powers at the Congress of Aix-La-Chapelle and the Congress of Verona four years later. Both combined meant that no military force other than Spain's would be sent to South America. This effectively blocked aid to Spain which inhibited her reconquest of the region. With the Royal Navy in command of the oceans this set the precedence - they were a decisive factor in the struggle for independence of certain Latin American countries.

=== Canning's Role ===
In August 1822, Castlereagh committed suicide. Canning succeeded him as both Foreign Secretary in his second term of office and Leader of the House of Commons. In effect Canning carried on Castlereagh's legacy to more effect. He wanted to ensure the demise of Spanish colonialism and to make sure that the newly independent South American colonies opened to trade as well. In addition Castlereagh wanted to prevent the region coming into the French sphere of influence. In this he was most successful; he oversaw the independence of South and Central America, aiding British merchants to open new markets across the region. Britain's position began to shift in September 1823 when London wrote to Madrid informing them of the plan to send consular officials to South America and the newly independent states.

== Aftermath ==
In January 1825 the first minister from a South American state, Colombia, was officially received in London. By 1826 it was recognised that Britain was the determining factor in the relations of South America to the rest of the world.

By this stage Britain by now for several years had walked her tightrope very successfully; she had kept the Spanish as an ally for European affairs. At the same time British intervention between 1815 and 1819, was one of the key factors for the independence of South American states. Especially important was the rearming of the revolutionary armies, the role of the British Legions in Bolivar's campaigns, and the role of Lord Cochrane's squadron in Chile's naval campaign.

British influence was sufficient to prevent Spain from attempting any serious reassertion of its control over its lost colonies. British merchants cut the monopolies that been held by the Spanish elite. Thereafter Britain remained the most important commercial partner for all South American countries especially in supplying mass consumer goods such as textiles, as well as offering a market that was free of import duties after the 1840s.

=== Legacy ===
In 1926 the Pan-American Centennial Conference (also known as the Congress of Bolivar) took place in Panama City. It celebrated the centenary of the South American movement to Independence, and during the event it was declared that:

"Great Britain lent to the liberty of Spanish America not only the support of its diplomacy, represented by Canning, but also an appreciable contingent of blood and it may be asserted that there was no battlefield in the War of Independence in which British blood was not shed".

== See also ==
- Decolonization of the Americas

== Bibliography ==
- Blaufarb, Rafe (2016). Forrest, Alan; Hagemann, Karen; Rowe, Michael (eds.). War, Demobilization and Memory: The Legacy of War in the Era of Atlantic Revolutions War, Culture and Society, 1750-1850. Springer. ISBN 9781137406491.
- Brown, Matthew (2006). Adventuring through Spanish Colonies: Simón Bolívar, Foreign Mercenaries and the Birth of New Nations. Liverpool University Press. ISBN 9781846310447.
- Heredia, Edmundo (1972). "Los intereses británicos y los intentos de reconquista de Hispanoamérica".
- Hughes, Ben (2010). Conquer or Die!: Wellington's Veterans and the Liberation of the New World. Osprey. ISBN 978-1849081832.
- Flores, Marcello (2016). Paulussen, Christophe; Capone, Francesca; De Guttry, Andrea (eds.). Foreign Fighters under International Law and Beyond. Springer. ISBN 9789462650992.
- Graham-Yooll, Andrew (1983). Small Wars You May Have Missed. Junction Books. ISBN 9780862451165.
- Kaufmann, William W (1967). British Policy and the Independence of Latin America Volume 52 of Yale Historical Publications Yale historical publications. Psychology Press. ISBN 9780714611105.
- Kaufman, Will; Macpherson, Heidi Slettedahl, eds. (2005). Britain and the Americas: E–P, Volume 2 Transatlantic Relations. ABC-CLIO. ISBN 9781851094318.
- Keen, Benjamin; Haynes, Keith (2012). A History of Latin America (9 ed.). Cengage Learning. ISBN 9781133709329.
- Lynch, John (2008). Simon Bolivar: A Life. Yale University Press. ISBN 9780300137705.
- Miller, Rory (2014). Britain and Latin America in the 19th and 20th Centuries Studies In Modern History. Routledge. ISBN 9781317870289.
- Rodriguez, Moises Enrique (2006). Freedom's Mercenaries: British Volunteers in the Wars of Independence of Latin America. Hamilton Books. ISBN 9780761834380.
- Schlez, Mariano Martín (2022). The Woodbine Parish Report on the Revolutions in South America (1822) The Foreign Office and Early British Intelligence on Latin America. Liverpool University Press. ISBN 9781802079111.
- Slatta, Richard W; Grummond, Jane Lucas De (2003). Simón Bolívar's Quest for Glory. Texas A&M University Press. ISBN 9781585442393.
- Thomas, Donald (2012). Cochrane: Britannia's Sea Wolf. Orion. ISBN 9781780225708.
- Waddell, D. A. G. (1987). "British Neutrality and Spanish–American Independence: The Problem of Foreign Enlistment".

Journals

- McFarlane, Anthony (2016). "Relaciones internacionales y guerras coloniales: El contexto internacional de las independencias americanas". TEMPUS Revista en Historia General (in Spanish). Medellín, Colombia.
