= West India Regiments =

Infantry units of the British Army

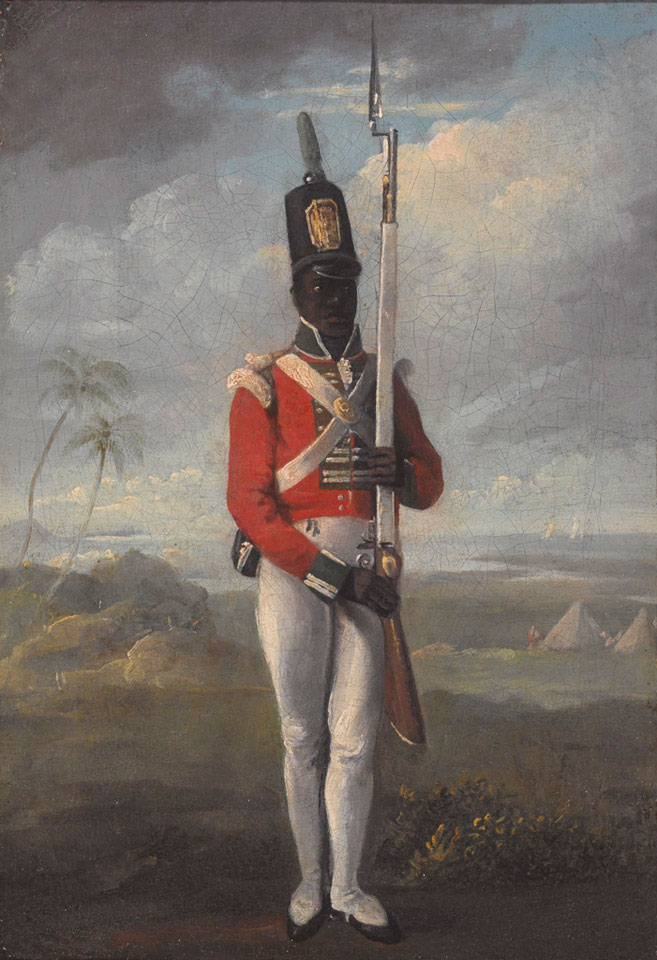
- c. 1803 portrait of an 8th West India Regiment private
- Active: 1795–1927; 1958–1962
- Country: United Kingdom (for service in the West Indies and subsequently West Africa); Federation of the West Indies
- Branch: British Army
- Type: Infantry
- Size: 1 to 12 battalion sized units

Insignia
- Abbreviation: WIR

The West India Regiments (WIR) were a group of line infantry regiments of the British Army raised and normally stationed in the British West Indies between 1795 and 1927. In 1888 the two West India Regiments then in existence were reduced to a single regiment of two battalions. This regiment differed from similar forces raised in other parts of the British Empire in that it was a part of the British Army. In 1958 a new regiment was raised following the creation of the Federation of the West Indies with the establishment of three battalions, however, the regiment's existence was short-lived and it was disbanded in 1962 when its personnel were used to establish other military units in Jamaica and Trinidad and Tobago. Throughout their history, the WIR were involved in a number of campaigns in the West Indies and Africa, and also took part in the First World War, where they served in the Middle Eastern and East African theatres.

== History ==
=== Origins and early basis of recruitment ===
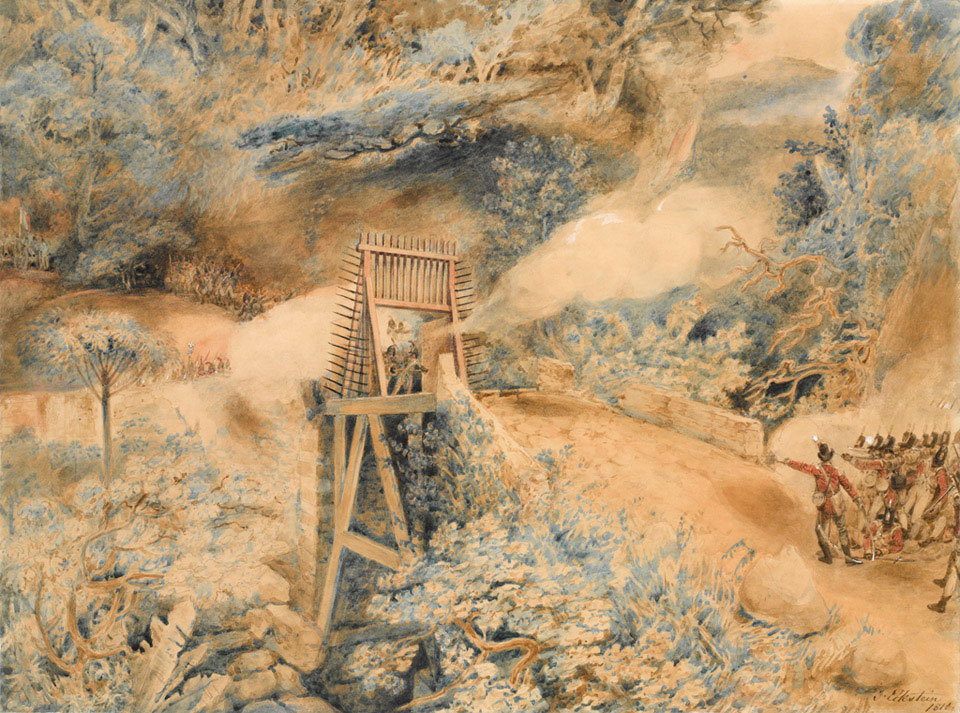
The 3rd West India Regiment engaging French troops during the British invasion of the Îles des Saintes on 14 April 1809

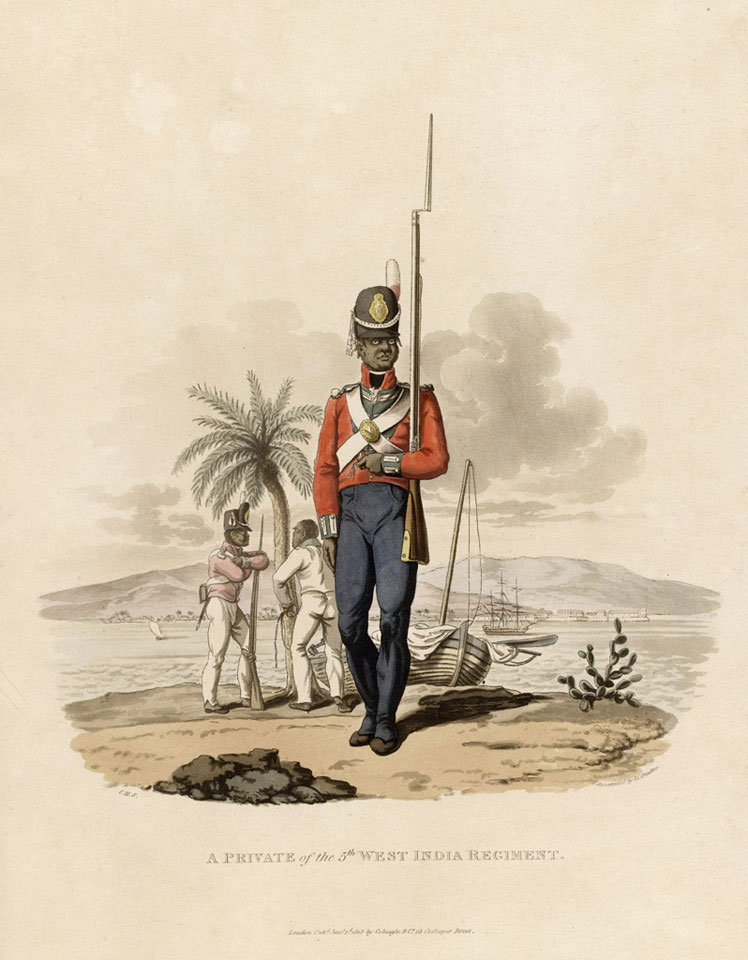
1812 engraving of a 5th West India Regiment private

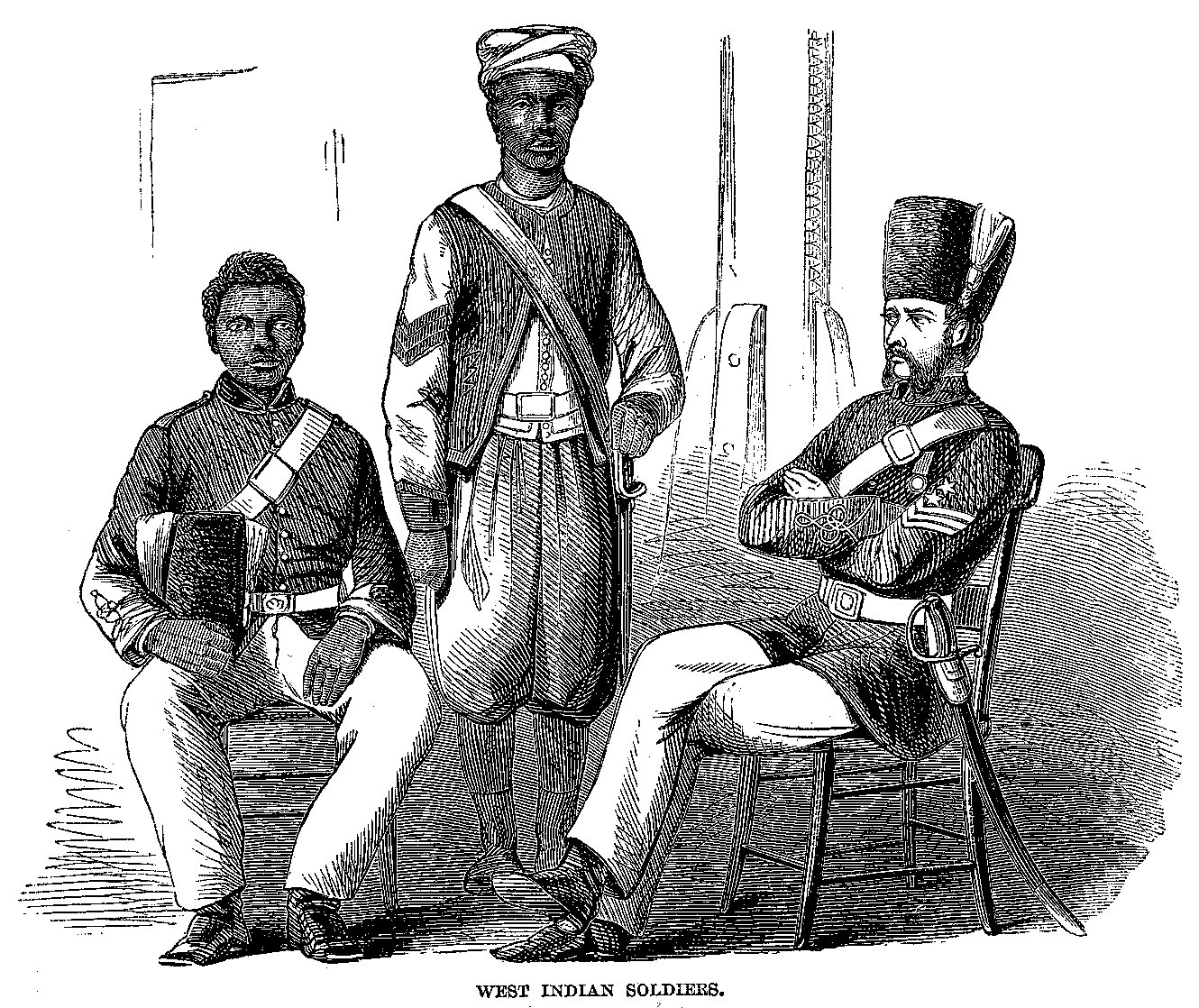
1861 illustration of West India Regiment soldiers in Jamaica

Eight West India Regiments were commissioned between 24 April and 1 September 1795. About 78 men from the Carolina Corps, established in 1779, were incorporated into the 1,000 man 1st West India Regiment. Soldiers were mainly acquired by recruiting free Black men from the West Indies and purchasing enslaved men from West Indian plantations. Between 1795 and 1808, an estimated 13,400 slaves were purchased for service in the West India Regiments at the cost of about £925,000. This constituted about 7% of the enslaved Africans imported into the British West Indies during this period. The eighth of the newly raised regiments (Skerrett's) was disbanded the following year but the quality of the new corps led to a further five West India Regiments being raised in 1798.

A revolt of the 8th West India Regiment in 1802 occurred when its soldiers took over the Fort Shirley garrison on Dominica for three days in protest over working conditions, and fears over being potentially sent to work in the cane fields.

All serving black soldiers recruited as slaves in the West India Regiments of the British Army were freed under the Mutiny Act 1807 passed by the British parliament that same year. In 1807, the Slave Trade Act caused all trading in slaves to be "utterly abolished, prohibited and declared to be unlawful". In 1812 a West African recruiting depot was established on Bance Island in Sierra Leone to train West African volunteers for the West India Regiments. By 1816 the end of the Napoleonic Wars and the reduction of the West India regiments to six led to the closure of this depot. Thereafter, all recruitment for the various West Indian regiments that fought in World War I and World War II were West Indian volunteers, with officers and some senior NCOs coming from Britain.

The WIR soldiers became a valued part of the British forces garrisoning the West Indies, where losses from disease and climate were heavy amongst white troops. The black Caribbean soldiers by contrast proved better adapted to tropical service. They served against locally recruited French units that had been formed for the same reasons. Free black Caribbean soldiers played a prominent and often distinguished role in the military history of Latin America and the Caribbean.

=== Nineteenth century ===
The new West India Regiments saw considerable service during the period of the Napoleonic Wars. In 1800, there were 12 battalion-sized regiments located in the British West Indies. Three companies of the First WIR repulsed a French attempt to recapture the island of Marie-Galante in August–September 1808, together with members of the first Corps of Colonial Marines recruited from local fugitive slaves.

The Regiments were later involved in the War of 1812, both on the Atlantic coast and in the Gulf of Mexico, taking part in the British attack on New Orleans. After the Slave Trade Act 1807, there was a shortfall of around five thousand members at the start of the War of 1812, and the war offered hope of new recruitment from Black slaves fleeing the United States. However, only eight joined the regiments from the Chesapeake Bay area in 1814, and a further thirteen on the coast of Georgia early in 1815, the great majority of refugees who offered military service preferring the newly formed Corps of Colonial Marines, whose officers later rejected government orders for transfer to the Regiments.

Following the end of the War of 1812, numbers were progressively reduced. Members of two of the disbanded regiments were settled in the eastern part of Trinidad, the 6th in 1817 and the 3rd in 1819, forming the main Muslim population in Trinidad before the first arrival of indentured Indian immigrants in 1845. During most of the remainder of the nineteenth century there were never less than two West India Regiments. The 1st West India Regiment from Jamaica went to the Gold Coast of Africa to fight in the Ashanti War of 1873–4. Both the 1st and 2nd West India Regiments served under the command of Sir Garnet Wolseley during this campaign, acquitting themselves well in difficult conditions.

In 1837, 60–100 disaffected African soldiers of the 1st West India Regiment mutinied in St. Joseph, Trinidad. They had recently been conscripted into the regiment after being liberated from illegal slave ships by the Royal Navy. The mutineers seized arms and ammunition, killing one enlisted soldier and setting fire to the officers' quarters. The Army and Trinidad Militia quickly suppressed the mutiny, killing twelve mutineers; six others committed suicide to avoid capture. Three ringleaders of the mutiny, including Daaga, were subsequently executed, while two others were sentenced to death but had their sentences commuted to penal transportation to Australia.

=== Summary ===
Regiment	Formed	Disbanded	Re-formed	Disbanded	Notes
1st West India Regiment	1795 (Whyte's)	1888			Merged to form West India Regiment in 1888
2nd West India Regiment	1795 (Myer's)	1888			Merged to form West India Regiment in 1888
3rd West India Regiment	1795 (Keppel's)	1819	1837	1870	
4th West India Regiment	1795 (Nicolls')	1819	1862	1869	
5th West India Regiment	1795 (Howe's)	1817			
6th West India Regiment	1795 (Whitelock's)	1817			
7th West India Regiment	1795 (Lewes's)	1802			
8th West India Regiment	1795 (Skerrett's)	1802			
9th West India Regiment	1798	1816			Renumbered as 7th Regiment in 1802
10th West India Regiment	1798	1802			
11th West India Regiment	1798	1803			Renumbered as 8th Regiment in 1802
12th West India Regiment	1798	1803			

== Formation of West India Regiment ==
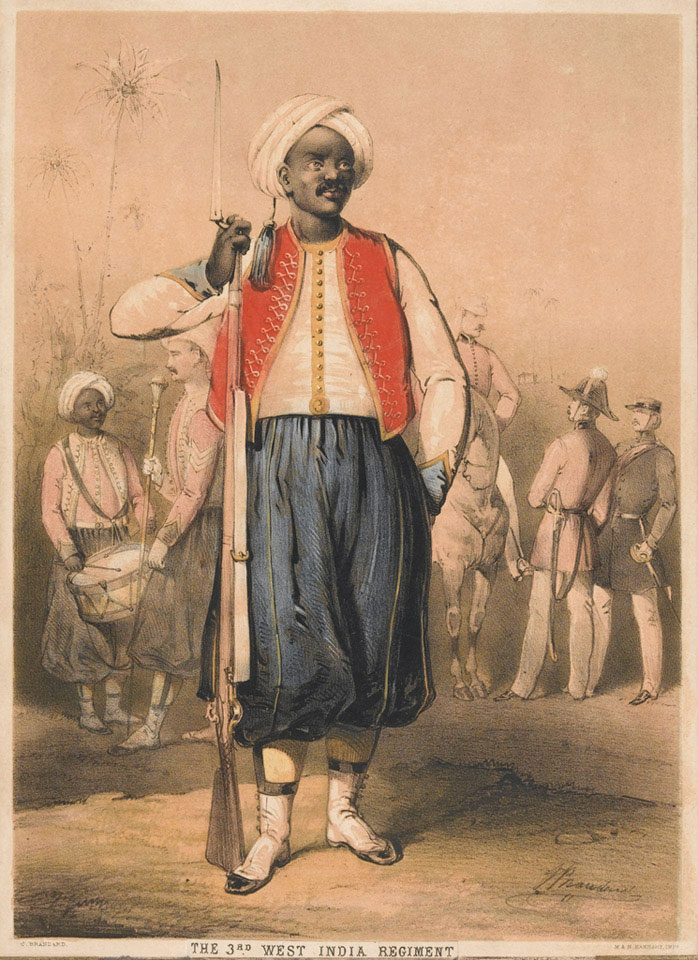
Soldier of the 3rd West India Regiment, 1863

On 1 October 1888, the 1st and 2nd West India Regiments were merged into a single regiment comprising two battalions. Each battalion consisted of eight companies plus a regimental depot for recruiting and other administrative matters situated in Kingston Jamaica. There was little direct interchanging between the two battalions since one was always serving in West Africa and one in the West Indies at this time.

A third battalion was raised in 1897, but was disbanded in 1904. Enlistment for the West India Regiment during this period involved a commitment for twelve years of full-time service. This was in contrast with most other infantry regiments of the British regular army, where recruitment was for seven years "with the colours" followed by five years with the reserves.

=== Later years ===
The regiment served in West Africa throughout the 19th century. In the early part of the twentieth century one battalion was stationed in Sierra Leone and the other was in Jamaica recruiting and training, the battalions exchanging every three years. The regiment fought in the Anglo-Ashanti Wars of 1873-74 and 1896, the Yoni Expedition (1887) and the Sierra Leone Hut Tax War of 1898.

=== World War I ===
On the outbreak of war in August 1914, the 1st Battalion of the WIR was stationed in Freetown where it had been based for two and a half years. A detachment of the Regiment's signalers saw service in the German Cameroons, where Private L. Jordon earned a DCM and several other men were mentioned in despatches. The 1st Battalion returned to the West Indies in 1916.

The 2nd Battalion was sent from Kingston to West Africa in the second half of 1915. They took part in the capture of Yaoundé in January 1916. The regiment was subsequently awarded the battle honour "Cameroons 1914-16". The 2nd Battalion, which had been divided into detachments, was brought together in Freetown in April 1916 and sent to Mombassa in Kenya, to take part in the East African campaign against German colonial forces based in German East Africa.

The five hundred and fifteen officers and men of the 2nd Battalion formed part of a column that took Dar es Salaam on 4 September 1916. After garrison duty, the battalion subsequently played a distinguished part in the Battle of Nyangao (German East Africa) in October 1917. For their service in East Africa the WIR earned eight Distinguished Conduct Medals, as well as the battle honour "East Africa 1914-18".

Following their active service in German Africa the 2nd Battalion of the West India Regiment was shipped to Suez in September 1918. It was then transferred to Lydda in Palestine where it spent the two remaining months of the war. Two battalions of a newly raised regiment also recruited from black Caribbean soldiers: the similarly named British West Indies Regiment (see below), saw front line service against the Turkish Army during the Palestine Campaign. General Allenby sent the following telegram to the governor of Jamaica: "I have great pleasure in informing you of the gallant conduct of the machine-gun section of the 1st British West Indies Regiment during two successful raids on the Turkish trenches. All ranks behaved with great gallantry under heavy rifle and shell fire and contributed in no small measure to the success of the operations".

=== Post war ===
After the war, the 1st and 2nd Battalions of the West India Regiment were amalgamated into a single 1st Battalion in 1920. This was disbanded in 1927. The reasons for disbandment were primarily economic. The West Indies had long been a peaceful military backwater with limited defence requirements and the substitute role under which the WIR had provided a single battalion as part of the garrison in Britain's West African possessions had become redundant as local forces were raised and expanded there. During the final post-war period only the regimental band served outside Jamaica, attending ceremonial functions in Toronto and London.

The actual disbandment of the reduced West India Regiment took place at the Up Park military camp in Jamaica on 31 January 1927, in a ceremony attended by the Governor and a large crowd. A smaller event took place two weeks later at Buckingham Palace when eight officers who had served with the WIR handed over the regimental colours to King George V.

=== Revival in 1958 ===
As the push for a federation of the British West Indies gathered steam in the 1950s, the question of defence was among the issues debated and it was decided to raise the West India Regiment (WIR) once again as the British Caribbean's single significant military unit.

The recreated regiment would take on the traditions of not only the previous regular army units (including the military band which had continued to exist when the WIR had been stood down in 1927) but also of the islands' local units. It would wear the old cap-badge and play the regimental march and its officers would dine using the old mess silver.

In preparation for the formation of the revived WIR, the West Indian federal government began to maintain the local units of the various islands from 1 April 1958, including the Jamaica Regiment which was intended to be the nucleus of the new WIR. On 15 December 1958, the federal legislature passed the Defence Act, 1958 which gave the legal basis for the formation of the new WIR and detailed its structure and mandate.

The West India Regiment then came into existence again on 1 January 1959, absorbing the greater part of the Jamaica Regiment (which simultaneously ceased to exist) with the officers and men of the Jamaica Regiment being transferred to the new WIR. The new WIR was headquartered in Jamaica at Harman Barracks in Kingston. In September 1960, plans were announced to raise two full battalions for the WIR, the 1st Battalion to be based in Jamaica and the 2nd Battalion in Trinidad and Tobago. The total strength of the regiment was to be 1,640, giving a total of 730 soldiers for each battalion.

The WIR was intended (like other regional institutions) to promote a sense of common pride and shared heritage and would be recruited from the various islands and serve throughout the region. It would be a means of introducing the troops to islands other than their own and to build friendships between the Caribbean public and their soldiers. The recruiting for the Regiment, which was the main fighting component of the Federal Defence Force, had been carried out on a federal basis with men from all the islands being recruited on a percentage basis related to the population of each territory. By September 1961, some 200 Trinidadians were serving in the regiment. A total of 14 Antiguans and 12 Kittitians served, though none emerged as officers.

In 1960, the 1st Battalion of the WIR was organized into four companies, one of which was a Headquarters Company, and had a depot with administrative staff. Its strength was about 500 men, half of whom were Jamaican, and about 40 seconded British officers and men. The proportion of non-Jamaicans in the battalion increased to two-thirds during 1960 and 1961 although the majority of the officers remained Jamaicans. The 2nd Battalion was formed as planned in 1960 as was a 3rd Battalion. In preparation for eventual West Indian independence, some bases previously used only by the British army were transferred to the WIR, including Newcastle which in 1959 became the Federal Defence Force Training Depot, training recruits from all over the newly formed Federation of the West Indies.

The presence of a federal military force in Jamaica presented the Jamaican government with constitutional difficulties regarding the use of WIR troops for internal security operations. As a result, a territorial auxiliary called the Jamaica Territorial Regiment was set up alongside the 1st Battalion WIR in February 1961 (the Jamaica Territorial Regiment would be renamed the Jamaican National Reserve in January 1962 and would later become a component of the Jamaica Defence Force). The 1st Battalion WIR was used in a variety of internal security roles prior to the enacting of Federal legislation (in May 1960) and Jamaican legislation (in December 1960) to resolve these difficulties. It was also used for internal security purposes between April 1960 and mid-1962. Ironically, one such operation was to supervise the referendum in Jamaica that resulted in the dissolution of the West Indies Federation and the WIR along with it and in the creation of the Jamaica Defence Force.

The collapse of the federation resulted in the West India Regiment again being disbanded, on 30 July 1962, the constituent battalions becoming the infantry regiments of the two largest islands:

- 1st Battalion — 1st Battalion, Jamaica Regiment
- 2nd Battalion — 1st Battalion, Trinidad and Tobago Regiment
- 3rd Battalion — disbanded.

== Officers ==
Overall, the WIR had a good record for discipline and effectiveness, although there were three mutinies between 1802 and 1837. A factor in these (and a weakness in the WIR during its earlier history) was that it did not always attract a high calibre of officer. Prevailing social attitudes meant that service with these regiments was not a popular option during much of the nineteenth century and many of the more capable officers saw their time with the WIR as simply a stepping stone to more sought after staff or other assignments. The attraction of colonial service was a matter of extra monetary allowances and sometimes better promotion prospects. Prior to 1914, officers had been commissioned into the WIR (as part of the British regular army) on a permanent basis. This was in contrast to colonial units such as the King's African Rifles where attachments for fixed terms were made from other regiments. However, by the end of World War I long-serving officers and non-commissioned officers, who had built up ties of mutual respect with their men, had mostly dispersed or retired and in its final years of service the WIR was also led by officers seconded from other British regiments for relatively short assignments.

== Battle honours ==
- Dominica, Martinique 1809, Guadeloupe 1810, Ashantee 1873–74, West Africa 1887, West Africa 1892–93 & 94, Sierra Leone 1898
- The Great War (2 battalions): Palestine 1917–18, E. Africa 1916–18, Cameroons 1915–16.

In June 2017, the African and Caribbean War Memorial, the first ever memorial to the African and Caribbean soldiers who fought in World Wars I and II, was unveiled at Windrush Square, Brixton, London.

== Victoria Crosses ==
Private Samuel Hodge of the 2nd WIR was awarded the Victoria Cross in 1866 for courage shown during the capture of Tubab Kolon in the Gambia. Private Hodge was the second black recipient of this decoration—the first being Able Seaman William Hall of the Royal Navy.

In 1891, Lance Corporal William Gordon of the 1st Battalion WIR received a VC for gallantry during a further campaign in the Gambia. Promoted to sergeant, Jamaican-born William Gordon remained in employment at regimental headquarters in Kingston until his death in 1922.

== Regimental Colonels ==
Colonels of the regiment were:

1st West India Regiment (1795–1888)

- 1795–1804: Gen. John Whyte
- 1804–1830: Gen. Lord Charles Henry Somerset
- 1830–1834: Gen. Sir Peregrine Maitland, GCB
- 1834–1839: Lt-Gen. Hon. Sir Henry King, KCB
- 1839–1842: Lt-Gen. Sir William Nicolay, KCH
- 1842–1843: Lt-Gen. Sir Henry Frederick Bouverie, GCB, GCMG
- 1843–1844: Lt-Gen. Sir Gregory Holman Bromley Way
- 1844–1855: Gen. Sir George Thomas Napier, KCB
- 1855–1876: Gen. Sir George Bowles, GCB
- 1876–1888: Gen. Sir Arthur Borton, GCB, GCMG
- 1888: Regiment amalgamated with 2nd West India Regiment to form the West India Regiment

2nd West India Regiment (1795–1888)

- 1795–1805: Lt-Gen. Sir William Myers, 1st Baronet
- 1805–1808: Gen. Richard Lambart, 7th Earl of Cavan, KC
- 1808: Lt-Gen. Eyre Power Trench
- 1808–1809: Gen. Sir Brent Spencer
- 1809–1818: Gen. Sir George Beckwith, GCB
- 1818–1822: Maj-Gen. Sir Henry Torrens, KCB
- 1822–1828: F.M. Sir John Byng, 1st Earl of Strafford, GCB, GCH
- 1828–1841: Gen. Francis Fuller
- 1841–1843: Gen. John Maister
- 1843–1848: Lt-Gen. Effingham Lindsay
- 1848–1860: Gen. Sir Robert John Harvey, CB
- 1860–1863: Lt-Gen. John Wharton Frith
- 1863–1864: Maj-Gen. Botet Trydell
- 1864–1870: Lt-Gen. Robert Law, KH
- 1870–1881: Gen. Brooke John Taylor
- 1881–1888: Gen. Sir Patrick Leonard Macdougall, KCMG (continued in West India Regiment)
- 1888: Regiment amalgamated with 1st West India Regiment to form the West India Regiment

The West India Regiment (1888–1962)

- 1888–1891: Lt-Gen. Sir Patrick Leonard MacDougall, KCMG
- 1891–1910: Gen. William John Chamberlayne
- 1910–1927: Maj-Gen. Henry Jardine Hallowes
- 1927: Regiment disbanded
- 1959: Regiment re-formed
- 1959–1962: Gen. Sir Gerald William Lathbury, GCB, DSO, MBE, KStJ (to Jamaica Regiment)
- 1962: Regiment disbanded

3rd West India Regiment (1795–1819, 1840–1870)

- 1795–1806: Gen. Sir William Keppel, GCB
- 1806–1809: Lt-Gen. Sir Hildebrand Oakes, Bt, GCB
- 1809: Gen. Sir John Coape Sherbrooke, GCB
- 1809–1818: Gen. Sir John Murray, Bt, GCH
- 1818–1819: Gen. Sir James Kempt, GCB, GCH
- 1819: Regiment disbanded
- 1840: Regiment reconstituted
- 1843–1848: Lt-Gen. Sir Charles William Maxwell, CB
- 1848–1849: Maj-Gen. Sir Guy Campbell, Bt, CB
- 1849–1862: Gen. Sir William Wood, KCB, KH
- 1862–1863: Maj-Gen. John Napper Jackson
- 1863–1870: Gen. Maurice Barlow, CB
- 1870: Regiment disbanded

4th West India Regiment (1795–1819, 1862–1869)

- 1795–1807: Gen. Oliver Nicolls
- 1807–1811: Lt-Gen. Sir Thomas Maitland, GCB, GCH
- 1811–1816: Lt-Gen. Sir James Leith, GCB
- 1816–1819: F.M. John Byng, 1st Earl of Strafford, GCB, GCH
- 1819: Regiment disbanded
- 1862: Regiment reconstituted
- 1862–1866: Lt-Gen. Sir Robert Garrett, KCB, KH
- 1866: Lt-Gen. John Julius Angerstein
- 1866–1869: Gen. George Thomas Colomb
- 1869: Regiment disbanded

5th West India Regiment (1795–1817, 1863–1865)

- 1795–1796: Col. Stephens Howe
- 1796–1800: Maj-Gen. Charles Graham
- 1800–1806: Gen. Sir Henry Calvert, Bt, GCB, GCH
- 1806: Gen. Sir Charles Asgill, Bt, GCH
- 1806–1817: Gen. Sir Alexander Hope, GCB
- 1817: Regiment disbanded
- 1863: Regiment reformed
- 1863–1865: Lt-Gen. William Forbes Macbean
- 1865: Regiment disbanded

6th West India Regiment (1795–1817)

- 1795–1806: Lt-Gen. John Whitelocke
- 1806–1813: Lt-Gen. Simon Fraser
- 1813–1815: Maj-Gen. Sir Edward Pakenham, GCB
- 1815–1817: Lt-Gen. Sir Miles Nightingall, KCB
- 1817: Regiment disbanded

7th West India Regiment (1795–1802)

- 1795–1796: Col. John Lewes
- 1796–1802: Gen. Alexander Campbell
- 1802: Regiment disbanded

8th West India Regiment (1798–1802)

- 1798–1802: Lt-Gen. Alexander Cochrane Johnstone
- 1802: Mutinied and reduced

9th West India Regiment (1798–1805)

- 1798–1799: Lt-Gen. Sir John Moore, KB
- 1799–1802: Gen. Sir George Don, GCB, GCH
- 1802: Renumbered 7th West India Regiment
- 1802–1805: Gen. Sir George Don, GCB, GCH
- 1805–1816: Gen. Isaac Gascoyne
- 1816: Regiment disbanded

10th West India Regiment (1798–1802)

- 1798–1802: Lt-Gen. Sir Thomas Maitland, GCB, GCH
- 1802: Regiment disbanded

11th West India Regiment (1798–1803)

- 1798–1802: Gen. Sir Thomas Hislop, Bt, GCB
- 1802: Renumbered 8th West India Regiment
- 1802–1803: Gen. Sir Thomas Hislop, Bt, GCB
- 1803: Regiment disbanded

12th West India Regiment (1798–1803)

- 1798–1803: Maj-Gen. Daniel O'Meara
- 1803: Regiment disbanded

== Uniform and traditions ==
For the first half century of its existence, the WIR wore the standard uniform (shako, red coat and dark coloured or white trousers) of the British line infantry of the period. The various units were distinguished by differing facing colours. One unusual feature was the use of slippers rather than heavy boots. In 1856 a very striking uniform was adopted for the regiments, modelled on that of the French Zouaves (see illustrations above). It comprised a red fez wound about by a white turban, scarlet sleeveless jacket with elaborate yellow braiding worn over a long-sleeved white waistcoat, and dark blue voluminous breeches piped in yellow. The regiment wore the white tassel on the fez which had distinguished the 1st WIR until the amalgamation of 1888, except for the regimental band which wore yellow.

The distinctive uniform described was retained for full dress throughout the regiment until 1914 and by the band alone until disbandment in 1927. It survives as the full dress of the band of the modern Barbados Defence Force.

== Members ==
- Henry Hadley, Said to be, as a civilian, the first British casualty of World War I.
- Leslie Thompson, member of the Band of the West India Regiment in the 1920s.

== Other West Indian Regiments ==
=== British West Indies Regiment ===
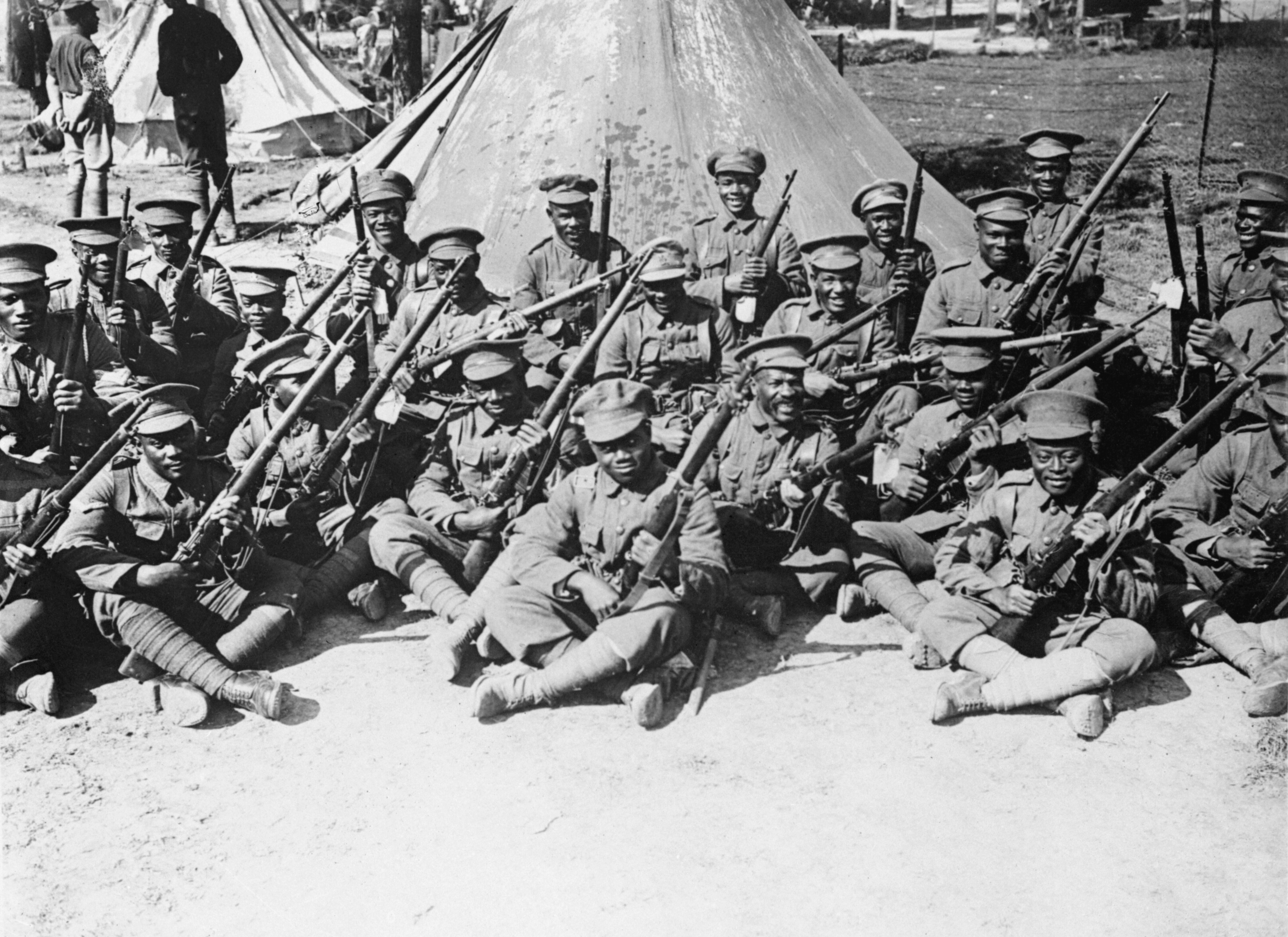
British West Indies Regiment at the Somme, September 1916

Surprisingly limited use was made of the well trained and long-serving regulars of the West India Regiment during World War I. However, in 1915 a second West Indies regiment was formed from Caribbean volunteers who had made their way to Britain. Initially, these volunteers were drafted into a variety of units within the British Army, but in 1915 it was decided to group them together into a single regiment, named the British West Indies Regiment. The similarity of titles has sometimes led to confusion between this war-time unit and the long established West India Regiment. Both were recruited from black Caribbean recruits and a number of officers from the WIR were transferred to the BWIR.

The regiment played a significant role in the First World War, especially in Palestine and Jordan where they were employed in military operations against the Turkish Army. A total of 15,600 men of the British West Indies Regiment served with the Allied forces. Jamaica contributed two-thirds of these volunteers, while others came from Trinidad and Tobago, Barbados, the Bahamas, British Honduras, Grenada, British Guiana (now Guyana), the Leeward Islands, St Lucia and St Vincent. Nearly 5,000 more subsequently volunteered.

=== Caribbean Regiment ===
Another West Indies regiment was formed in 1944, this time called the Caribbean Regiment. This consisted of members of the local militia forces, as well as direct recruits. The regiment conducted brief training in Trinidad and the United States, before being sent to Italy. Once there, the regiment performed a number of general duties behind the front lines—these included the escort of 4,000 prisoners of war from Italy to Egypt. Subsequently, the regiment undertook mine clearance around the Suez Canal. The regiment returned to the Caribbean in 1946 to be disbanded, having not seen front line action—this was due to inadequate training and partly because of the political impact in the British West Indies if it had incurred heavy casualties.

=== Sierra Leone Creoles ===
As noted above, the West India Regiment provided detachments for service in West Africa for more than a hundred years. This began when the 2nd WIR was sent to Sierra Leone to quell a rebellion of West Indian settlers in 1819. Upon completion of their service, some soldiers of this and subsequent WIR regiments remained in West Africa and intermarried with other Sierra Leone Creole settlers, whose descendants today are the Sierra Leone Creole people.

== See also ==
- Corps of Colonial Marines
- Arthur Andrew Cipriani
- British and Commonwealth protectorates
- Garrison Historic Area, Barbados
