= Maitland Monument =

Neoclassical monument in Corfu, Greece

Coordinates: 39°37′18.2″N 19°55′28.3″E

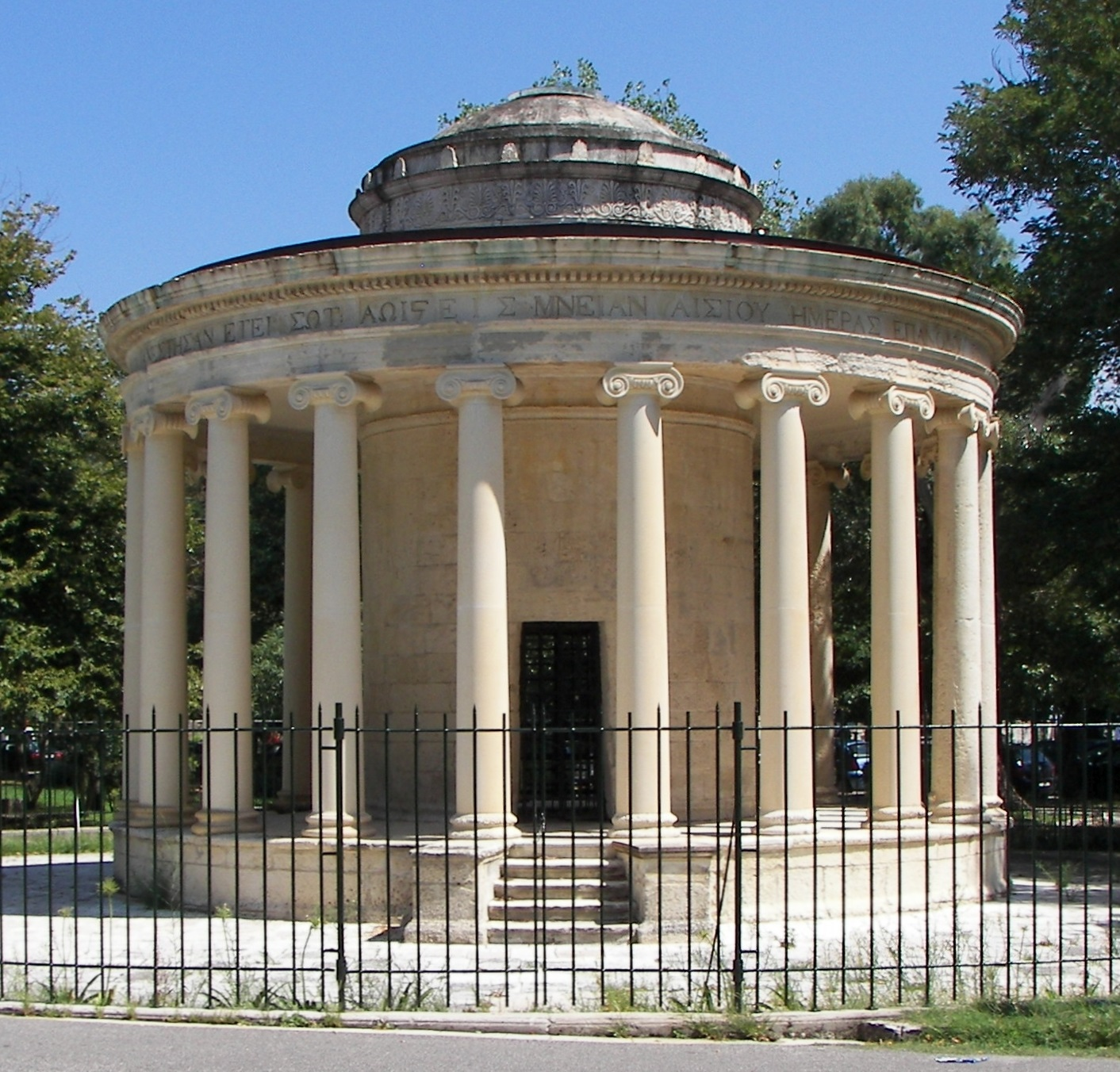
The Maitland Monument

The Maitland Monument, also known as the Maitland Rotunda or the Peristyle of Maitland (Greek: Περιστύλιο του Μαίτλαντ), is a neoclassical monument located at the end of Spianada Square in Corfu. It was built in 1821 to honour Sir Thomas Maitland, a British military officer who was the last Civil Commissioner and first Lord High Commissioner of the Ionian Islands.

Maitland arrived in Corfu on 16 February 1816, and eight months later, on 25 October 1816, forty-six noble Corfiots made a proposal for the construction of a triumphal arch in his honour. The monument was eventually constructed in 1821 in a completely different form of a rotunda with twenty Ionic columns. It was designed by Colonel George Whitmore of the Royal Engineers.

Like the Palace of St. Michael and St. George, the structure was built out of limestone imported from Malta, which was a British colony at the time. Maitland had simultaneously held the positions of Lord High Commissioner of the Ionian Islands and Governor of Malta. The sculptural work was done by the local sculptor Pavlos Prosalentis.

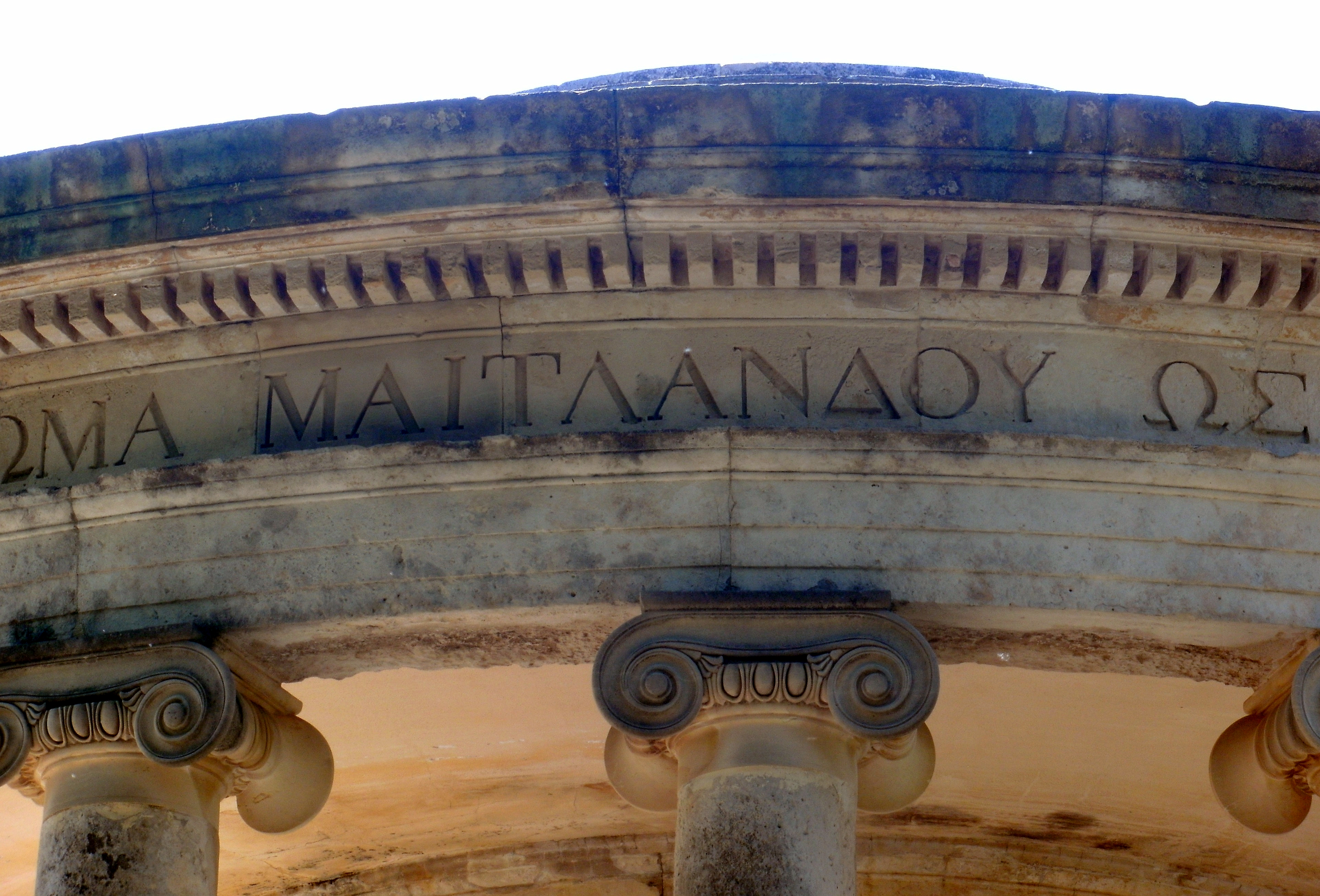
Part of the inscription and the Ionic capitals of the monument

The monument is also known as the Cistern (Greek: Στέρνα), since it is built on top of a Venetian-era underground water cistern which had been built in 1781. The two entrances of the monument allowed access to the water tank.

The top of the monument contains the following circular inscription:

ΕΙΣ ΜΝΕΙΑΝ ΑΙΣΙΟΥ ΗΜΕΡΑΣ ΕΠΑΝΟΔΟΥ ΕΚ ΜΕΓΑΛΗΣ ΒΡΕΤΑΝΝΙΑΣ ΘΩΜΑ ΜΑΙΤΛΑΝΔΟΥ ΩΣ ΕΥΘΥΝΤΗΡΩΣ ΠΟΛΙΤΙΚΟΥ ΚΑΤΑΣΤΗΜΑΤΟΣ ΝΗΣΩΝ ΙΟΝΙΚΩΝ ΠΟΛΙΤΑΙ ΚΕΡΚΥΡΑΙΟΙ ΑΝΕΣΤΗΣΑΝ ΕΤΕΙ ΣΩΤ ΑΩΙΣΤ

The Maitland Monument is visible in the 1981 Bond film For Your Eyes Only.

The monument was damaged due to erosion over the years, and it was restored in 2004.

== See also ==
- Monument to Sir Alexander Ball, Malta
