= William James Gordon =

Winner of the Victoria Cross

- Born: 19 May 1864; Jamaica, British West Indies
- Died: 15 August 1922 (aged 58); Kingston, Jamaica, British West Indies
- Burial place: Up Park Camp Military Cemetery
- Military career
- Allegiance: United Kingdom
- Branch: British Army
- Service years: 1885 - 1902
- Rank: Sergeant
- Units: West India Regiment
- Conflicts: Second Gambia Campaign
- Awards: Victoria Cross

William James Gordon, VC (19 May 1864 – 15 August 1922) was a West Indian soldier in the British Army and a recipient of the Victoria Cross, the highest award for gallantry in the face of the enemy that can be awarded to British and Commonwealth forces.

== Details ==
Born in Jamaica, Gordon enlisted in the 1st battalion, West India Regiment of the British Army in July 1885. At the beginning of 1892, he returned for a second tour of duty in west Africa, and was sent to the Gambia during the Second Gambia Campaign, to counter local hostility towards an Anglo-French boundary commission. Here he was part a detachment sent up river to the village of Toniataba, about 80 miles inland from Bathurst.

On 13 March 1892 lance corporal Gordon, then 27 years old, performed an act of gallantry for which he was awarded the Victoria Cross. His citation reads:

During the attack on the town of Toniataba, Major G. O. Madden, West India Regiment, who was in command of the Troops, was superintending a party of twelve men who were endeavouring with a heavy beam to break down the South Gate of the town, when suddenly a number of musket muzzles were projected through a double row of loop-holes which had been masked. Some of these were within two or three yards of that Officer's back, and before he realized what had happened Lance-Corporal Gordon threw himself between. Major Madden and the muskets, pushing that Officer out of the way, and exclaiming "Look out, Sir!" At the same moment Lance-Corporal Gordon was shot through the lungs.
By his bravery and self-devotion on this occasion the Lance-Corporal probably saved the life of his Commanding Officer.

Gordon recovered from his wound, and continued to serve in the army. In 1897, and now a sergeant, he was part of the West India Regiment contingent that attended Queen Victoria's 1897 diamond jubilee celebrations in London. After leaving the army in April 1902, he served as warden of the firing range at Up-Park Camp in Kingston, Jamaica. He died on 15 August 1922 following a stroke, and was buried with military honours at Up Park military cemetery.

Gordon's VC is on display at the Jamaica Defence Force Museum in Kingston, Jamaica.

Gordon was one of two members of the West India Regiment to be awarded the VC. The other, Private Samuel Hodge, from Tortola, British Virgin Islands, received the award for bravery in the Gambia in 1866.
