= Samuel Hodge =

West Indian recipient of the Victoria Cross

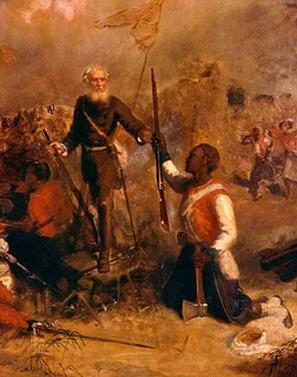
- Louis William Desanges, The Capture of Tubabecelong, Gambia, 1866 (detail)
- Born: c. 1840; Tortola, British Virgin Islands
- Died: 14 January 1868; British Honduras
- Burial place: Belize City Military Cemetery
- Military career
- Allegiance: United Kingdom
- Branch: British Army
- Rank: Lance Corporal
- Units: 4th Battalion West India Regiment
- Awards: Victoria Cross

Samuel Hodge, VC (c. 1840 – 14 January 1868) was a West Indian soldier in the British Army and a recipient of the Victoria Cross, the highest award for gallantry in the face of the enemy that can be awarded to British and Commonwealth soldiers. From the island of Tortola in the British Virgin Islands, he was the second black man to be awarded the Victoria Cross after William Hall.

== Details ==
Samuel Hodge was one of the West Indian soldiers who garrisoned British positions on the West coast of Africa during the 19th century. White troops suffered terribly from malaria, blackwater fever and dysentery, and the War Office addressed the problem by using troops of the West India Regiments.

In 1866, Lieutenant Colonel George Abbas Kooli D'Arcy, commanding officer of the 3rd West India Regiment and Governor of The Gambia, marched to confront a rebellious Marabout leader named Amar Faal at Tubabecolong (also known as Tubab Kolon), a stockaded town on the northern bank of the River Gambia; taking with him 270 officers and men of the 4th West India Regiment from the Bathurst garrison, Hodge being one; around 500 warriors from the Soninke people later joined his force. He attacked the town on 30 June.

Private Hodge was about 26 years old (his precise date of birth is not known). The British force had light armaments and rockets, but failed to break through the wooden stockade by bombardment. D'Arcy called for volunteers to assist him in trying to cut a breach by hand. Two officers and fifteen men (including Hodge) seized axes and followed him. However, the fire of the defenders was intense; those officers were killed almost immediately, and most of the remaining men were wounded. D'Arcy and the two uninjured men, Hodge and another soldier (Private Boswell), reached the stockade, and hacked a gap in it large enough for a man. Boswell was killed, leaving only D'Arcy and Hodge of the original assault party of eighteen. D'Arcy went through the gap – followed closely by Hodge, who used his axe to hack open the inside fastenings on two more gates before being shot down.

Hodge sustained serious gunshot wounds, but survived. British troops poured in through the now open gates; and in the fierce fighting that followed, several hundred of the Marabouts were killed, and the village and stockade burned down. Once the day had been won, D'Arcy presented Hodge to his regiment as the bravest man among them, to universal acclamation.

Hodge was promoted to the rank of lance corporal, and was presented with the Victoria Cross on 24 June 1867. However, he never fully recovered from the terrible injuries he had sustained during the attack, and died of fever less than a year later during service in British Honduras (now Belize), and was buried at the military cemetery there.

== Victoria Cross citation ==
The citation reads:

4th West India Regiment, Private Samuel Hodge

Date of Act of Bravery, June 30th, 1866

For his bravery at the storming and capture of the stockaded town of Tubabecolong, in the kingdom of Bami, River Gambia, on the evening of the 30th of June last. Colonel D'Arcy, of the Gambia Volunteers, states that this man and another, who was afterwards killed,– pioneers in the 4th West India Regiment,– answered his call for volunteers, with axes in hand, to hew down the stockade. Colonel D'Arcy having effected an entrance, Private Hodge followed him through the town, opening with his axe two gates from the inside, which were barricaded, so allowing the supports to enter, who carried the place from east to west at the point of the bayonet. On issuing to the glacis through the west gate, Private Hodge was presented by Colonel D'Arcy to his comrades, as the bravest soldier in their regiment, a fact which they acknowledged with loud acclamations.

— London Gazette, 4 January 1867.
