= Maitland Plan =

19th century British plan to capture Buenos Aires and Chile

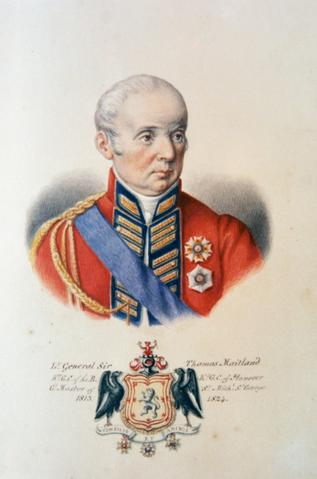
Sir Thomas Maitland, creator and namesake of the plan

The Maitland Plan (Spanish, Plan de Maitland), refers to a plan created by British Major General Thomas Maitland in 1800 to disintegrate the bulk of the Spanish Empire in America. The plan was titled Plan to capture Buenos Aires and Chile, and then emancipate Peru and Quito. The plan was never formally implemented but it influenced the South American wars of independence.

== Background ==
By the 1780s Britain was seeking to expand its influence in South America following the loss of the Thirteen Colonies of North America, which had become independent with the help of France and Spain (under the command of Lafayette and de Gálvez).

The first notion of a plan had been implemented during the Nootka Crisis in 1790, when Britain was planning a war with Spain who had support from France. The revolutionary Franciso de Miranda presented his ideas to the British government about the independence of Spanish territories in America. The idea was put into motion but was cancelled once the crisis had passed. Nevertheless, in 1795 Nicholas Vansittart wrote a white paper outlining a way to take South America away from Spain, which became known as the 'Vansittart plan'. This was then shelved, due to the French Revolutionary Wars when Britain and Spain nominally allied against Revolutionary France.

== The plan ==
In 1796 Spain was defeated by France and was forced into an alliance with them against Great Britain. The Vansittart plan was then reinstated but this time under the guise of Thomas Maitland, who created additional points.

The plan consisted of the following steps:

- Seize control of Buenos Aires.
- Take position in Mendoza.
- Coordinate actions with an independentist Chilean army.
- Cross the Andes.
- Defeat the Spanish and take control of Chile.
- Continue through sea and liberate Peru.

The British tried to put the plan in practice twice and failed. They attempted to seize Buenos Aires and Montevideo in 1806 and 1807, during the British invasions of the Río de la Plata, but were eventually defeated by the Spanish army and the local militias.

An addition to the plan was added by Home Riggs Popham with an attack on Venezuela at the behest of Francisco De Miranda. By 1808 they planned to put it in motion, with a large force which was assembled and placed under the command of Arthur Wellesley, but Napoleon's invasion of Spain that year suddenly transformed Spain into an ally of Britain. British military actions against Spanish South America therefore ceased in the subsequent Peninsular War.

Despite the alliance between Britain and Spain, the Maitland Plan was not cancelled. According to Argentine historians like Felipe Pigna and Rodolfo Terragno, José de San Martín, the Argentine general and prime leader of the southern part of South America's successful struggle for independence from the Spanish Empire, was introduced to the plan (during his stay in London in 1811) by members of the Lautaro Lodge: a Freemasonic Lodge founded by Francisco de Miranda and Scottish Lord MacDuff (James Duff, 4th Earl Fife). San Martín was allegedly part of the lodge, and he took the Maitland Plan as a blueprint for the movements necessary to defeat the Spanish army in South America, he carried on successfully with the last five points of the plan, and thus liberated a great part of the continent.

The British themselves finally fulfilled the Maitland plan in 1817, when it became involved in the South American campaigns. In this, Britain operated in a clandestine role - financially, politically and militarily, which was highly successful.

== Aftermath ==
The Maitland plan had effectively been achieved more or less by the late 1820's.

Britain played a major role in the independence of the South American states, and together with the United States, they became the determining factor in the relations between the rest of the world and Hispanic America during a convoluted 19th century. The dependence largely remains to this day, with the United States occupying the central role. From the 1840's the British Empire and the United States exercised huge political influence in the new sovereign states of Hispanic America, controlling maritime commerce, spreading the Spanish Black Legend, ending the Manilla Galleon trade between Hispanic America and Asia, providing loans to the independent governments, and often supporting one or both sides of the ensuing civil wars (e.g. between York vs Scottish masonic rites).

This in turn strengthened the British Empire during the rest of the 19th century, much as the remnants of the Portuguese Empire had been taken over by the Dutch East India Company and West India Company during the Dutch-Portuguese War. Similarly, the United States quickly gained influence over the liberal governments of Mexico through the diplomacy of people such as Joel Roberts Poinsett, and used it to pact a colony in Texas with President Vicente Guerrero. This was later used as casus belli in the American invasion of Mexico of 1846-1848. The economy of Argentina became reliant on agricultural commodities sold to the British Empire. This produced an initial period of growth and massive Italian and Spanish migration to Argentina by the turn of the century, followed by crisis starting in the 1930s. Meanwhile, Cuba, Puerto Rico and the Philippines lasted as the final remains of the Spanish Empire until 1898, when they were taken over by the United States during the Spanish–American War.
