= 4th West India Regiment =

The 4th West India Regiment was one of the West India Regiments (WIRs) in the British Army. It was originally formed in 1795 under the command of Colonel Oliver Nicolls. Nearly all of the rank and file soldiers were born in Africa. Before 1807 they had generally been purchased from slave ships by the army. But after the parliamentary abolition of the British transatlantic slave trade in 1807, the British Navy intercepted ships of other nations carrying slaves, and often these slaves were recruited to the West India Regiments.

== Gibraltar ==
The 4th WIR was stationed in Gibraltar from 14 March 1817 to 9 March 1819. At the end of this assignment they were dispatched to Sierra Leone where the regiment was disbanded.

== Colonels ==
The following officers served as colonels of the regiment:

- General Oliver Nicolls 20 May 1795
- Lieutenant-General Sir Thomas Maitland 19 July 1807
- Lieutenant-General Sir James Leith 19 July 1811
- Field-Marshal Lord Strafford 12 December 1816

Disbanded 24 April 1819, reconstituted February 1862

- Lieutenant-General Sir Robert Garrett 1 April 1862
- Lieutenant-General John Angerstein 14 January 1866
- General George Thomas Colomb 24 April 1866

Disbanded 1 April 1869
