= Henry Jardine Hallowes =

British military officer (1838–1926)

Major-General Henry Jardine Hallowes
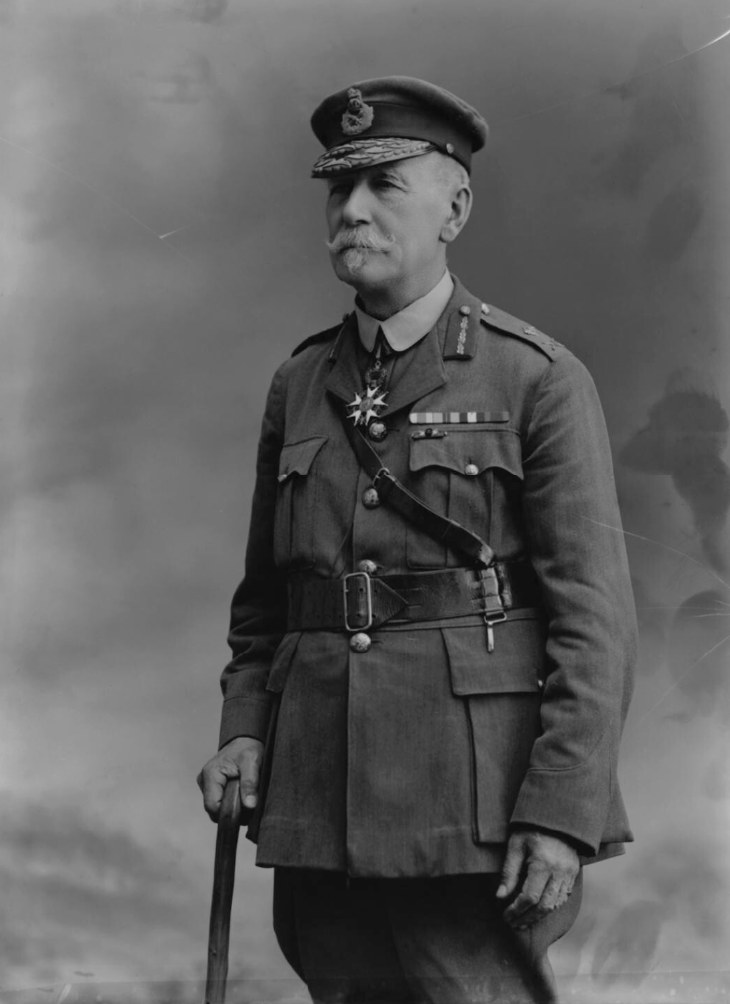
- Hallowes in 1918

Acting Governor of Jamaica
- In office 18 January 1898 – 11 February 1898
- Monarch: Victoria
- Preceded by: Henry Arthur Blake
- Succeeded by: Augustus William Lawson Hemming

Personal details
- Born: 13 November 1838
- Died: 28 June 1926 (aged 87) Strathpeffer, Scotland

Military service
- Allegiance: United Kingdom
- Branch/service: British Army; Canadian Army; British Indian Army; West India Regiment
- Years of service: 1855–1919
- Rank: Major-General

Henry Jardine Hallowes (13 November 1838 – 28 June 1926) was a British military officer. A career soldier, he served in the Army for 64 years, beginning in 1855 and continuing through World War I. Among the various colonial administrative roles he held, he briefly served as the Acting Governor of Jamaica in 1898.

== Biography ==
Henry Jardine Hallowes, the son of Admiral John Hallowes, was born on 13 November 1838. His military career began in 1855 when he joined the British Army. His early postings included serving as adjutant of the 15th Foot and Adjutant-General of the New Brunswick Militia. He also took on the role of adjutant at the School for Officers of the Reserve Forces.

Hallowes served in various international locations, including India and Jamaica, where he held the significant post of General Officer Commanding the Troops from 1895 to 1900. His leadership extended to civilian governance, as he was an ex-officio member of the Legislative Council during his time in Jamaica. He was later appointed Colonel-in-Chief of the West India Regiment.

Despite nearing his eighties, Hallowes served throughout World War I. His contributions earned him numerous honors, including the Collar of a Commander of the Legion of Honour and the Croix de Guerre with Palms.

Hallowes married twice and was survived by his widow and one child. He died in Strathpeffer, Scotland, on 28 June 1926, at the age of 87.
