= Thomas Maitland (British Army officer) =

British Army officer, politician and colonial administrator (1760–1824)

Lieutenant-General The Right Honourable Sir Thomas Maitland GCB GCMG GCH
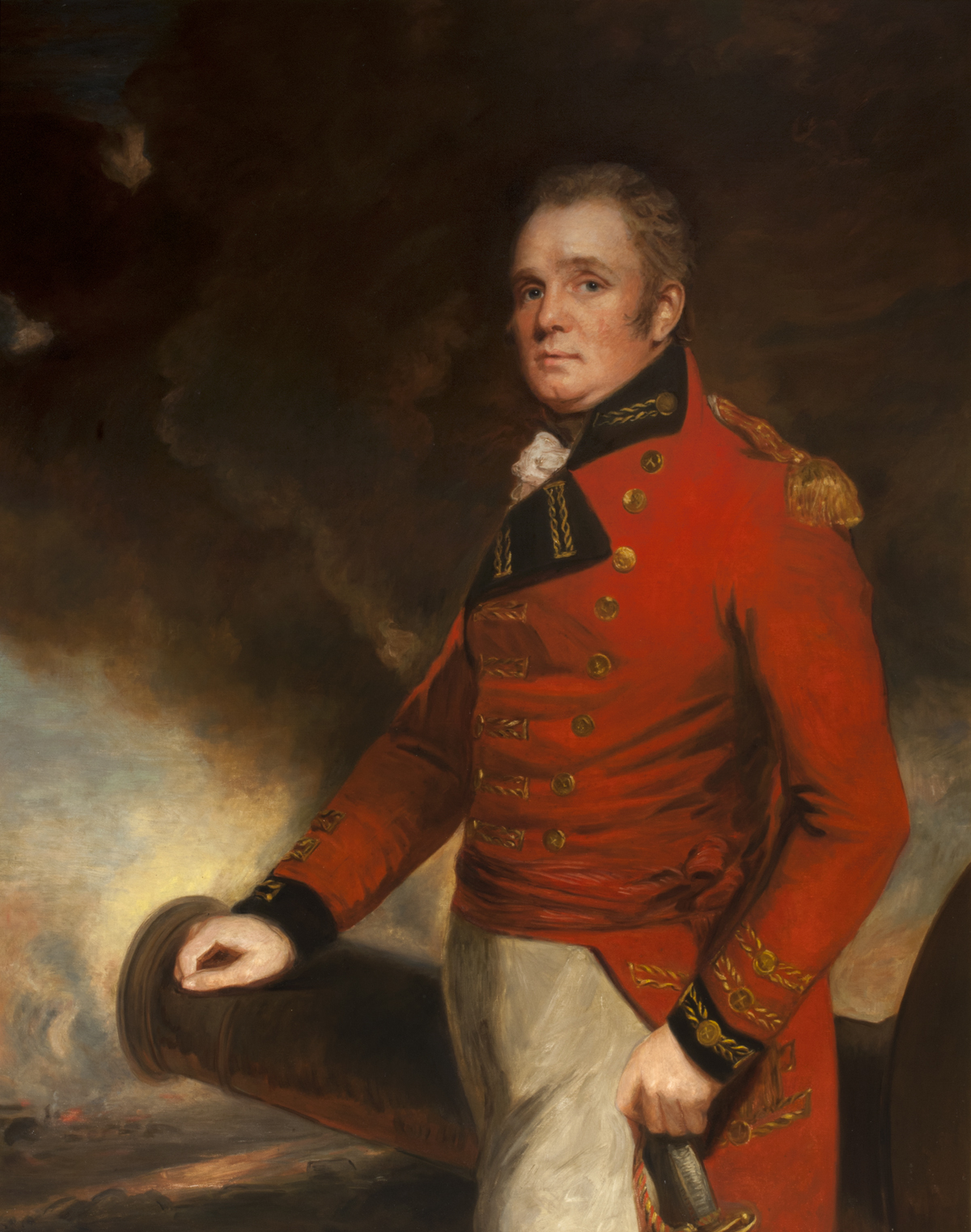
- Portrait by John Hoppner, c. 1800

Governor of British Ceylon
- In office 19 July 1805 – 19 March 1811
- Governor: George III
- Preceded by: Frederick North
- Succeeded by: John Wilson

General Officer Commanding, Ceylon
- In office 1805–?
- Preceded by: David Douglas Wemyss
- Succeeded by: John Wilson

Governor of Malta
- In office 23 July 1813 – 17 January 1824
- Preceded by: Hildebrand Oakes (as Civil Commissioner)
- Succeeded by: Francis Rawdon-Hastings

Lord High Commissioner of the Ionian Islands
- In office 1816–1823
- Preceded by: James Campbell of Inverneill
- Succeeded by: Frederick Adam

Personal details
- Born: 10 March 1760 Scotland
- Died: 17 January 1824 (aged 63) Malta
- Awards: Knight Grand Cross of the Order of the Bath; Knight Grand Cross of the Royal Guelphic Order

Military service
- Allegiance: United Kingdom
- Branch/service: British Army
- Rank: Lieutenant-General
- Unit: 62nd (Wiltshire) Regiment of Foot
- Commands: General Officer Commanding, Ceylon
- Battles/wars: Haitian Revolution; Napoleonic Wars; Peninsular War

Lieutenant-General Sir Thomas Maitland (10 March 1760 – 17 January 1824) was a British Army officer, politician and colonial administrator. He also served as a Member of Parliament for Haddington from 1790 to 1796, 1802–06 and 1812–13. He was made a Privy Councillor on 23 November 1803. He was the second surviving son of James Maitland, 7th Earl of Lauderdale, and the younger brother of James Maitland, 8th Earl of Lauderdale. Maitland never married.

== Early military career ==
Maitland was commissioned into the Edinburgh Light Horse, shortly after his birth, but did not take up his commission until he joined the 78th (Highland) Regiment of Foot (Seaforth Highland Regiment) as a captain in 1778. He transferred to the 62nd Foot as a major in 1790. He was promoted lieutenant-colonel in 1794 and colonel and brigadier-general in 1798.

== Haitian Revolution ==
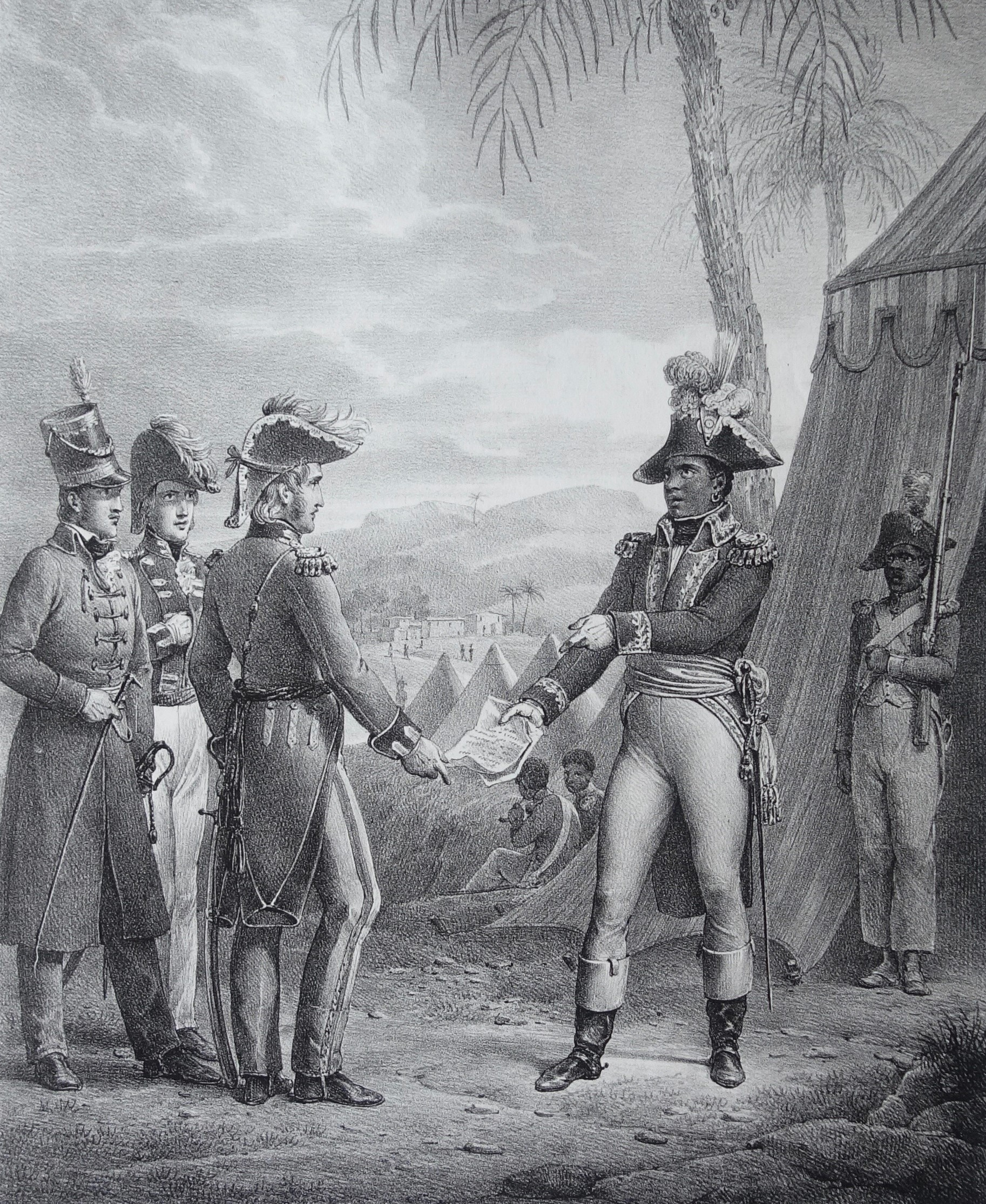
General Maitland meets Toussaint L'Ouverture to discuss the secret treaty.

In 1797, Maitland landed in Saint-Domingue, under orders to capture the French colony. Maitland realised that his forces were quickly dying in droves due to yellow fever, and he began to negotiate a retreat with Toussaint Louverture, a Black general in French service.

Elkins and McKitrick write:

It was in fact Maitland and not the War Ministry who had determined that Britain's only sensible choice, rather than try to maintain any kind of presence at Jérémie and Môle-Saint-Nicolas, was to deal directly with Louverture and negotiate a total evacuation of the island. Accordingly he and the black general concluded a secret agreement on August 31, 1798. Great Britain would desist from any further attack on St. Domingue and any interference with its internal affairs; Louverture made a similar promise with regard to Jamaica; and Maitland would see that provisions were allowed to reach the ports of St. Domingue without interference from British cruisers.

In May 1799, Maitland returned to Saint-Domingue to negotiate an extension of the agreement with Louverture. On 13 June, in the presence of Edward Stevens, the representative of the United States on the island, Maitland and Louverture signed the Maitland Convention, which stipulated that the ports of Le Cap and Port-Républicain would be opened to Anglo-American shipping.

In 1800 he devised the Maitland Plan - a six point plan to free South America from Spanish rule. This later became a blueprint for José de San Martín, the prime leader of the southern part of South America's struggle for independence, when he was introduced to the plan in 1811 by Francisco De Miranda.

== Governor of Ceylon ==
The governor's palace, Mount Lavinia, Sri Lanka, now known as Mount Lavinia Hotel.

Maitland served as Governor of Ceylon (Sri Lanka) during 1805 to 1811. While at Ceylon, Maitland was attracted to a place at "Galkissa" (Mount Lavinia) and decided to construct his palace there. During this time, Maitland fell in love with a mixed race dancing-girl named Lovina, who had been born to Portuguese and Sinhalese parents. A folktale sometimes repeated states that during the construction of the palace, Maitland gave instructions for the construction of a secret tunnel to Lovina's house, which was located close to the governor's palace. One end of the tunnel was inside the well of Lovina's house and the other end was in a wine cellar inside the governor's palace. When the governor came to reside there, he would often use the tunnel to meet Lovina. The Sinhalese village that surrounded the Governor's mansion developed into a modern city named "Galkissa". Later the city was renamed "Mount Lavinia" in honour of Lovina. In 1920 the tunnel was sealed up. The bicentenary celebration of the Mount Lavinia Hotel was held in 2005. Some of Sir Thomas Maitland's relatives living in the UK attended the ceremony. Two roads in central Colombo in modern-day Sri Lanka, are named for him, Maitland Crescent and Maitland Place.

== Peninsular War ==
In early 1812, The 1st Earl of Wellington began the campaign that resulted in his victory at the Battle of Salamanca on 22 July. To prevent Marshal Louis Gabriel Suchet from sending French reinforcements from the east coast of Spain, Wellington requested that Lord William Bentinck launch a diversionary operation using the British garrison of Sicily. At first Bentinck agreed to send 10,000 of his soldiers, but in March he reversed himself. After much persuasion, he allowed the operation to go forward and on 7 June he put 8,000 men aboard naval transports under the command of Maitland. The fickle Bentinck changed his mind again on 9 June, stopping the expedition. At last on 28 June Maitland sailed for Menorca. The fleet first picked up 6,000 Spanish troops at Menorca and landed on 31 July at Palamós, 65 miles (105 km) northeast of Barcelona. He wisely decided that Barcelona was too strong to attack, but he also refused to try to capture weakly held Tarragona. Maitland soon received news that Joseph O'Donnell's Army of Murcia had been routed at the Battle of Castalla on 21 July. Without the support of O'Donnell, Maitland decided he could not accomplish anything. He re-embarked his expeditionary force and sailed to Alicante instead, joining his troops with the garrison to form an army of 15,000 men. With the disaster at Salamanca, the French were forced to evacuate both Madrid in central Spain and Andalusia in the south. Their combined forces joined Suchet in the province of Valencia. About 80,000 French soldiers, Maitland declined to move from Alicante. Maitland asked to be relieved in September 1812 due to illness.

== Governor of Malta and of the Ionian Islands ==
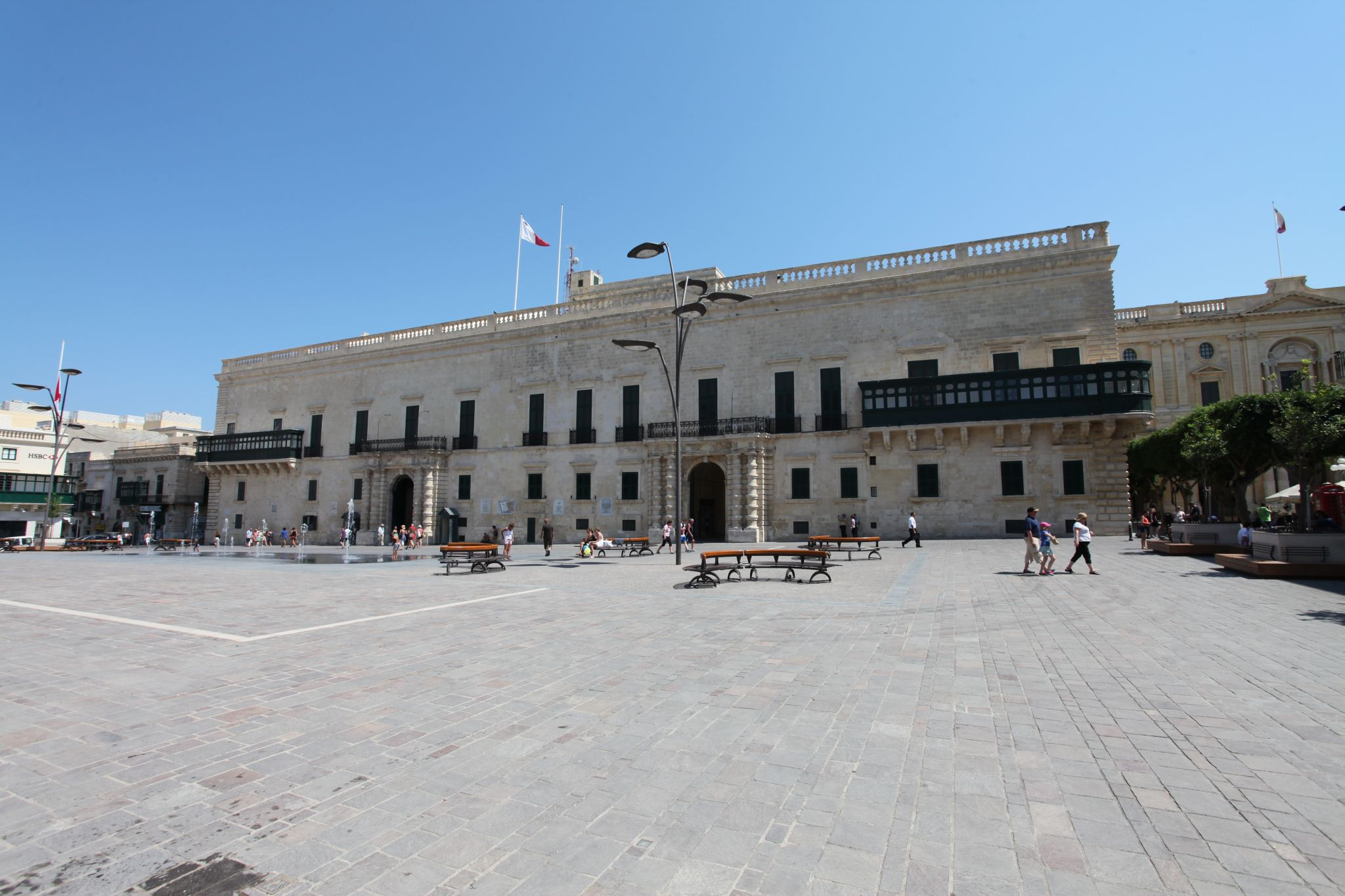
The Governor's Palace, Valletta, Malta.

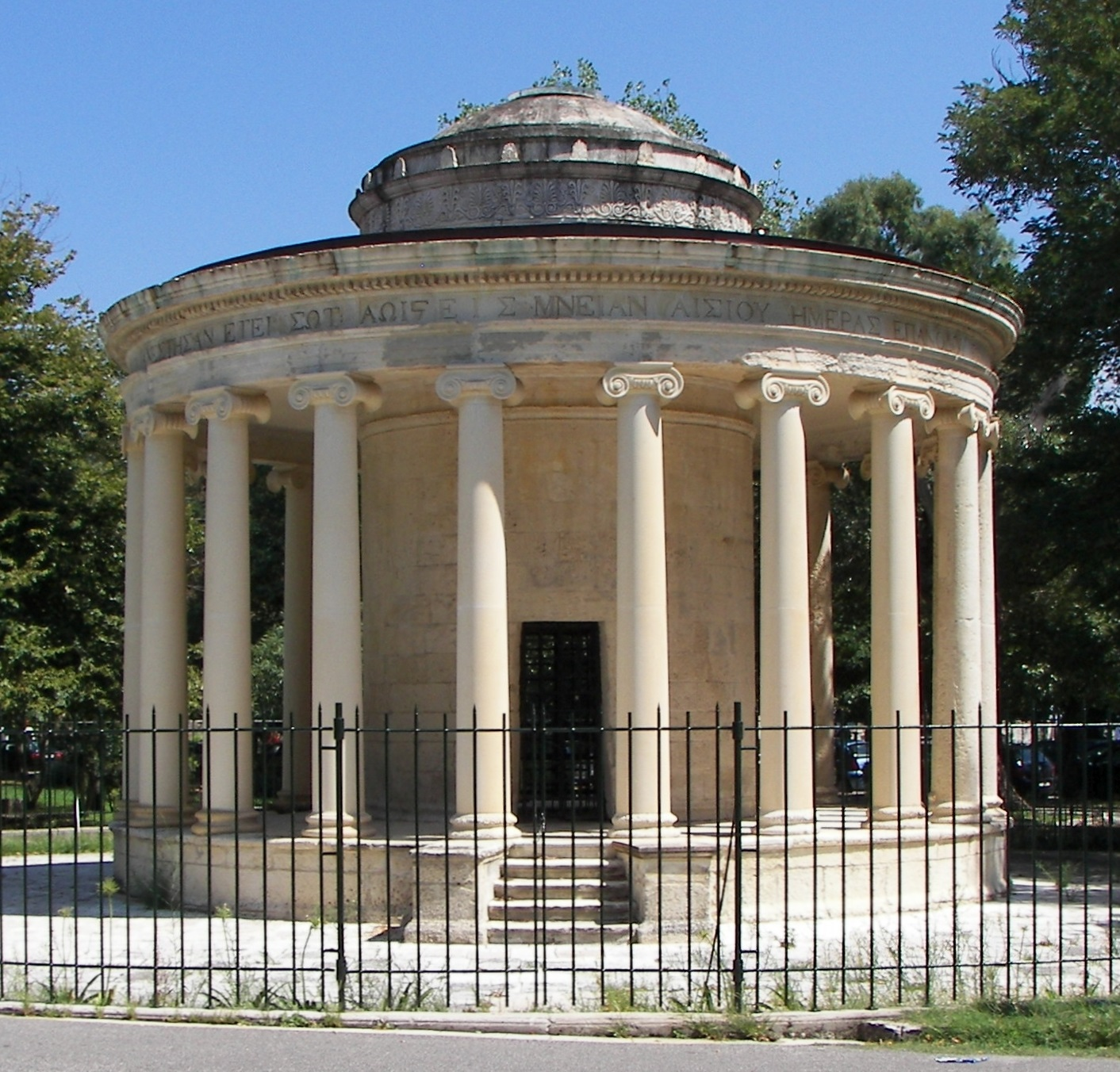
Maitland Monument in Corfu.

Maitland became Lieutenant-Governor of Portsmouth and General Officer Commanding South-West District in May 1813 and was then appointed as Governor of Malta on 23 July, when the island became a crown colony instead of a protectorate. The plague had broken out in Malta in March 1813 and the disease began to spread especially in Valletta and the Grand Harbour area. Maitland arrived on the island on 3 October 1813 and took his oath of office on 5 October. Once in post, he enforced stricter quarantine measures. The plague spread to Gozo by the following January, but the islands were free of the disease by March 1814. Overall, 4486 people were killed which amounted to 4% of the total population. It is thought that the outbreak would have been worse without Maitland's strict actions.

After the eradication of the plague, Maitland made several reforms. He removed British troops from Lampedusa on 25 September 1814, ending the dispute that had started in 1800. On Malta, he was autocratic and he refused to form an advisory council made up of Maltese representatives, and so he was informally known as "King Tom". He formed the Malta Police Force in 1814, while the local Italian-speaking Università was dissolved in 1819. Various reforms were undertaken in taxation and the law courts as well. Maitland remained Governor until his death from apoplexy on 17 January 1824. He was attended on his death-bed by doctors Robert Grieves, Alexander Broadfoot and John Hennen.

While he was Governor of Malta, Maitland also served as Lord High Commissioner of the Ionian Islands during 1815 to 1823, while the islands were a British protectorate. The seat of administration was at Corfu, where he was represented by Sir Frederick Hankey, his private secretary. The neoclassical Maitland Monument was built there in his honour in 1821.

== See also ==
- Mount Lavinia Hotel
- Maitland Plan
- Law enforcement in Malta

Political offices
| Preceded by Frederick North | Governor of Ceylon; 1805–1811 | Succeeded by John Wilson, acting |
| Preceded by Sir Hildebrand Oakes (Civil Commissioner) | Governor of Malta; 1813–1824 | Succeeded by The Marquess of Hastings |
| New title | Lord High Commissioner of the Ionian Islands; 1815–1823 | Succeeded by Sir Frederick Adam |
Parliament of Great Britain
| Preceded by William Fullarton | Member of Parliament for the Haddington Burghs; 1790–1796 | Succeeded by Robert Baird |
Parliament of the United Kingdom
| Preceded by Robert Baird | Member of Parliament for the Haddington Burghs; 1802–1805 | Succeeded by John Dalrymple |
| Preceded by Sir George Warrender, Bt | Member of Parliament for the Haddington Burghs; 1812–1813 | Succeeded by The Earl of Lauderdale |
Military offices
| Preceded by Arthur Whetham | GOC South-West District; May 1813 – July 1813 | Succeeded by William Houston |
| New regiment | Colonel of the 10th West India Regiment; 1798–1802 | Regiment disbanded |
| New regiment | Colonel of the 5th Garrison Battalion; 1803–1805 | Regiment disbanded |
| New regiment | Colonel of the 3rd Garrison Battalion; 1805–1807 | Succeeded by The Lord Forbes |
| Preceded by David Douglas Wemyss | General Officer Commanding, Ceylon; 1805–? | Succeeded by John Wilson |
| Preceded by Oliver Nicolls | Colonel of the 4th West India Regiment; 1807–1811 | Succeeded by Sir James Leith |
| Preceded by Henry Edward Fox | Colonel of the 10th Regiment of Foot; 1811–1824 | Succeeded by Sir John Lambert |
Honorary titles
| New title | Grand Master of the Order of St Michael and St George; 1818–1824 | Succeeded by The Duke of Cambridge |
