= List of lord high commissioners of the Ionian Islands =

Map of the Ionian Islands.

The Lord High Commissioner of the Ionian Islands was the local representative of the British Crown in the United States of the Ionian Islands between 1816 and 1864, succeeding the earlier office of the Civil Commissioner of the Ionian Islands. At the time, the United States of the Ionian Islands was a federal republic under the amical protection of the United Kingdom, as established under the 1815 Treaty of Paris. Governors were based in Corfu, northernmost of the seven Ionian Islands, which are off the western coast of mainland Greece.

== List ==
=== Civil Commissioners (1809–1816) ===
Portrait	Name (Birth–Death)	Term of office	
	John Oswald (1771–1840)	16 October 1809	February; 1811
	Richard Church (1784–1873)	February; 1811	December; 1811
	George Airey (1761–1833)	December; 1811	1813
	Sir James Campbell (1763–1819)	30 April 1813	17 February 1816
	Sir Thomas Maitland (1759–1824)	17 February 1816	31 March 1816

=== Lord High Commissioners (1816–1864) ===
Portrait	Name (Birth–Death)	Term of office	
	Sir Thomas Maitland (1759–1824)	31 March 1816	17 January 1824
	Sir Frederick Adam (1781–1853)	7 January 1824	2 June 1832
	Sir Alexander George Woodford (1782–1870)	28 April 1832	1 December 1832
	George Nugent-Grenville; 2nd Baron Nugent (1788–1850)	1 December 1832	23 February 1835
	Sir Alexander George Woodford (1782–1870) (acting)	23 February 1835	29 April 1835
	Sir Howard Douglas (1776–1861)	29 April 1835	8 June 1841
	James Alexander Stewart-Mackenzie (1784–1843)	8 June 1841	17 February 1843
	Sir George Berkeley (1785–1857)	15 September 1842	1 April 1843
	John Colborne; 1st Baron Seaton (1778–1863)	1 April 1843	2 June 1849
	Sir Henry George Ward (1797–1860)	2 June 1849	13 April 1855
	Sir George Young (1807–1876)	13 April 1855	25 January 1859
	William Ewart Gladstone (1809–1898)	25 January 1859	17 February 1859
	Sir Henry Knight Storks (1811–1874)	17 February 1859	2 June 1864
