= Oliver Nicolls =

General Oliver Nicolls
- Born: 1742; County Wexford
- Died: 3 December 1829 (aged 86–87); Chichester
- Relatives: Sir Jasper Nicolls (nephew); Sir William Green (father-in-law)
- Military career
- Allegiance: United Kingdom
- Branch: British Army
- Service years: 1756–1829
- Rank: General
- Unit: 1st Regiment of Foot
- Commands: 45th Regiment of Foot; Bombay Army; Governor of Anholt
- Conflicts: American Revolutionary War; French Revolutionary Wars; West Indies campaign; Fédon's rebellion; Napoleonic Wars

General Oliver Anthony Nicolls (1742 – 3 December 1829) was a British Army officer.

== Military career ==
Nicolls was commissioned into the 1st Regiment of Foot in November 1756. In 1793, a yellow fever epidemic began in Grenada and spread throughout the Caribbean, many of Nicolls’ soldiers who came from Europe perished and so he was obliged to recruit black soldiers to fill in the gaps, raising two companies and starting a trend in the Caribbean which would later from the West India Regiments. He then became Quartermaster-General in the West Indies in 1794, in which capacity he subdued a rebellion in Grenada. He became Commander-in-chief of the Bombay Army on 22 January 1801 retiring from that post in 1808 to become a member of the Board of Inquiry into the Convention of Sintra under which the defeated French were allowed to evacuate their troops from Portugal without further conflict. He went on to serve as Governor of the Island of Anholt in 1813.

Nicolls was also colonel of the 54th Regiment of Foot and then the 66th Regiment of Foot.

Military offices
Preceded by James Stuart	C-in-C, Bombay Army; 1801–1808	Succeeded by John Abercromby
Preceded by Lord Clanricarde	Colonel of the 66th (Berkshire) Regiment of Foot; 1808–1829	Succeeded by Sir William Anson
Preceded by Sir David Baird	Colonel of the 54th (West Norfolk) Regiment of Foot; 1807–1808	Succeeded by Edward Finch
