= Frank McEachren =

Colonel Frank McEachren CM CVO ED CD ADC
- Born: 6 June 1918; Surrey, England, United Kingdom
- Died: 31 March 1995 (aged 76); Toronto, Ontario, Canada
- Burial place: Mount Pleasant Cemetery, Toronto, Ontario, Canada
- Education: St. Andrew's College
- Alma mater: Trinity College, University of Toronto
- Spouse: Florence Eaton (m. 1940)
- Children: 2
- Relatives: Sir Joseph Flavelle, 1st Bt. (grandfather)

Colonel Frank Flavelle McEachren CM CVO ED CD ADC (6 June 1918 – 31 March 1995) was a Canadian Army officer and businessman. He served as chief aide-de-camp to six Lieutenant Governors of Ontario.

== Early life and education ==
McEachren was born on 6 June 1918 in Surrey, England, to Lieutenant Colonel Frank Yeigh McEachren (1889–1957) and Clara Ellsworth Flavelle OBE (1890–1966). His maternal grandfather was businessman Sir Joseph Flavelle, 1st Bt., the last Canadian to be granted a baronetage. He had one younger sister, June McEachren Barrett (1922–1997). His parents divorced in 1939.

He was educated at St. Andrew's College before attending Trinity College at the University of Toronto, where he earned a Bachelor of Arts in 1940.

== Career ==
McEachren joined the 48th Highlanders of Canada in 1940 and served with the regiment during the Allied invasion of Sicily and the following Italian campaign in World War II. He later became Honorary Colonel of the 48th Highlanders.

After the war, he began his career with Eaton's, his wife's family's department store chain, beginning as public relations manager in 1944. In 1951, he became the first director of the newly established Public Relations Office.

In 1955, he began work in the Lieutenant Governor of Ontario's office. He served as chief aide-de-camp to six Lieutenant Governors: Louis Orville Breithaupt, John Keiller MacKay, William Earl Rowe, William Ross Macdonald, Pauline Mills McGibbon and John Black Aird. He retired in 1982.

A personal friend of Queen Elizabeth II, in 1977, when Prince Andrew attended Lakefield College School near Peterborough, Ontario, McEachren was his guardian. He often hosted the Prince at his cottage in Muskoka.

From 1980–1982, McEachren was Grand Prior of the Military and Hospitaller Order of Saint Lazarus of Jerusalem in Canada. He was a founding member of the Royal Heraldry Society of Canada and involved in the creation of the Canadian Heraldic Authority.

Active in philanthropy, McEachren held prominent roles in many organizations. He was chairman of the Eaton Foundation, president of the Ontario Council of St. John Ambulance, chairman of the Ontario Arts Council, president of the Canadian Cancer Society, president of the Canadian Opera Company, governor of the Canadian Players Foundation, and governor of St. Andrew's College. He sat on the boards of the Toronto Board of Trade, Canadian Public Relations Society and Bishop Strachan School.

== Personal life ==
In May 1940, McEachren married Florence Mary Eaton (1919–2012), daughter of Sir John Craig Eaton and Lady Eaton, of the prominent Eaton family, at Timothy Eaton Memorial Church. They met at Florence's debutante ball hosted by her mother at the Eaton Auditorium. They had one son Gilbert Flavelle McEachren (1947–1984) and adopted a daughter Signy McEachren Farncomb (born 1953).

McEachren died on 31 March 1995 in Toronto at the age of 76. He was buried at Mount Pleasant Cemetery. After his death, his widow donated photo albums, video footage and souvenirs documenting his career, friendship with the royal family and philanthropic work to the Archives of Ontario.

== Honours ==
- 25 June 1975: Member of the Order of Canada (CM)
- Commander of the Royal Victorian Order (CVO)
- The Most Venerable Order of the Hospital of Saint John of Jerusalem:
  - 21 June 1968: Officer (OStJ)
  - 29 November 1974: Commander (CStJ)
  - 18 December 1980: Knight (KStJ)
- The Canadian Efficiency Decoration (ED)
- The Canadian Forces' Decoration (CD)
