= Frank Wickson =

Canadian architect (1861–1936)

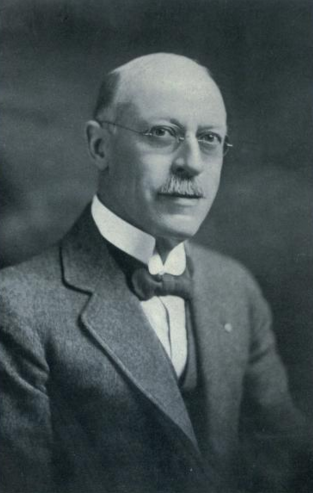
Alexander Frank Wickson (1919)

Alexander Frank Wickson (March 30, 1861 – December 22, 1936) was a prominent Toronto architect who was responsible for the design of numerous buildings, including Timothy Eaton Memorial Church, the IOOF Hall (Toronto) and the "Ardwold" mansion for the Eaton family. He was president of the Ontario Association of Architects in 1900 and of the Royal Architectural Institute of Canada from 1918 to 1920.

== Early life and education ==
Frank Wickson was born in Toronto on March 30, 1861, to John and Eliza Wickson. He received his education at Jarvis Collegiate, Upper Canada College and the Ontario School of Art. Following this, he became an apprentice at the architectural firm of Smith and Gemmell and lived for a time in Buffalo, New York. He later become a junior member of the Darling and Curry architectural firm.

== Architectural career ==
In 1890, Wickson formed a partnership with Norman Bethune Dick, another Toronto architect, as the firm of Dick and Wickson. Buildings designed by Dick and Wickson include the Hazelton Avenue Congregational Church and the original clubhouse for the Royal Canadian Yacht Club. In 1893, Toronto's branch of the Independent Order of Odd Fellows commissioned a new hall in response to an increase in membership. Dick and Wickson were responsible for the design of the new IOOF hall, which included the first electric elevator used by a society building in the city. Following his partner's death in 1895 at the age of 35, Wickson continued practising by himself until 1904, when he formed a second partnership with Alfred Holden Gregg, as the firm of Wickson and Gregg.

Wickson was elected as President of the Ontario Association of Architects (OAA) in 1900. Starting in 1902, Wickson was a delegate of the Ontario Association of Architects to the Canadian National Exhibition. He helped design the exhibition's ground plan in cooperation with Edmund Burke and Eden Smith. Wickson remained involved with the planning of the Canadian National Exhibition until the early 1930s.

In 1911, John Craig Eaton and Flora Eaton commissioned the design of a large residence on Spadina Avenue from Wickson and Gregg, which they named Ardwold. This 50-room mansion was one of the most luxurious houses in Toronto at the time, and it included a pipe organ, conservatory, landscaped grounds and a swimming pool. The house was sold in 1936 and demolished soon after.

The Wickson and Gregg firm was responsible for the design of three Carnegie libraries, located in Toronto, Brampton, and Paris, Ontario. Wickson worked with Alfred Chapman in the design of the Toronto library, which is currently the Koffler Student Centre at the University of Toronto.

Wickson also designed the Marmaduke Cartage warehouse, owned by Marmaduke Rawlinson, the owner of Toronto's first storage and moving business. This warehouse was on land once owned by Frank's father, John Wickson. The building was taken down and rebuilt around a new condominium project, housing the upscale "The Wickson Social" restaurant located at 5 St. Joseph Street in Toronto.

From 1918 to 1920, Wickson was President of the Royal Architectural Institute of Canada. In this capacity, he led a Canadian delegation to the first Pan-American Congress of Architects held in Montevideo, Uruguay.

Other buildings designed by Wickson, and associates include Calvin Presbyterian Church, Berkeley Street Fire Hall (now Alumnae Theatre), "Haltonbrooke", a residence in Oakville, Ontario, for Sir Joseph Flavelle and the home of Marmaduke Rawlinson, located on 22 Maple Avenue, Rosedale, Toronto.

== Personal life ==
Frank Wickson was the son of John and Eliza Wickson. John was a prominent member of the Toronto business community, who once owned a summer home that he called Forest Hill in Toronto.

Frank Wickson married Annie Elizabeth Fisher. They had one son, Carl Jennings Wickson (February 1896 – November 21, 1960). Carl and his wife Frances had three children: John Alexander Wickson, William Fisher Wickson and Julia Wickson.

Frank Wickson was a member of the executive committee of the Arts and Letters Club, a society for leading members of Toronto's artistic community, including the Group of Seven. He contributed articles to Lamps, the club's journal, on the state of architecture in Toronto.

Wickson died at his home on Oriole Road in Toronto on December 22, 1936. His obituary in Lamps referred to him as "an architect of judgment and ability and a man of quaint and friendly humour." He is buried at Mount Pleasant Cemetery, Toronto.
