= Eaton Hall (King City) =

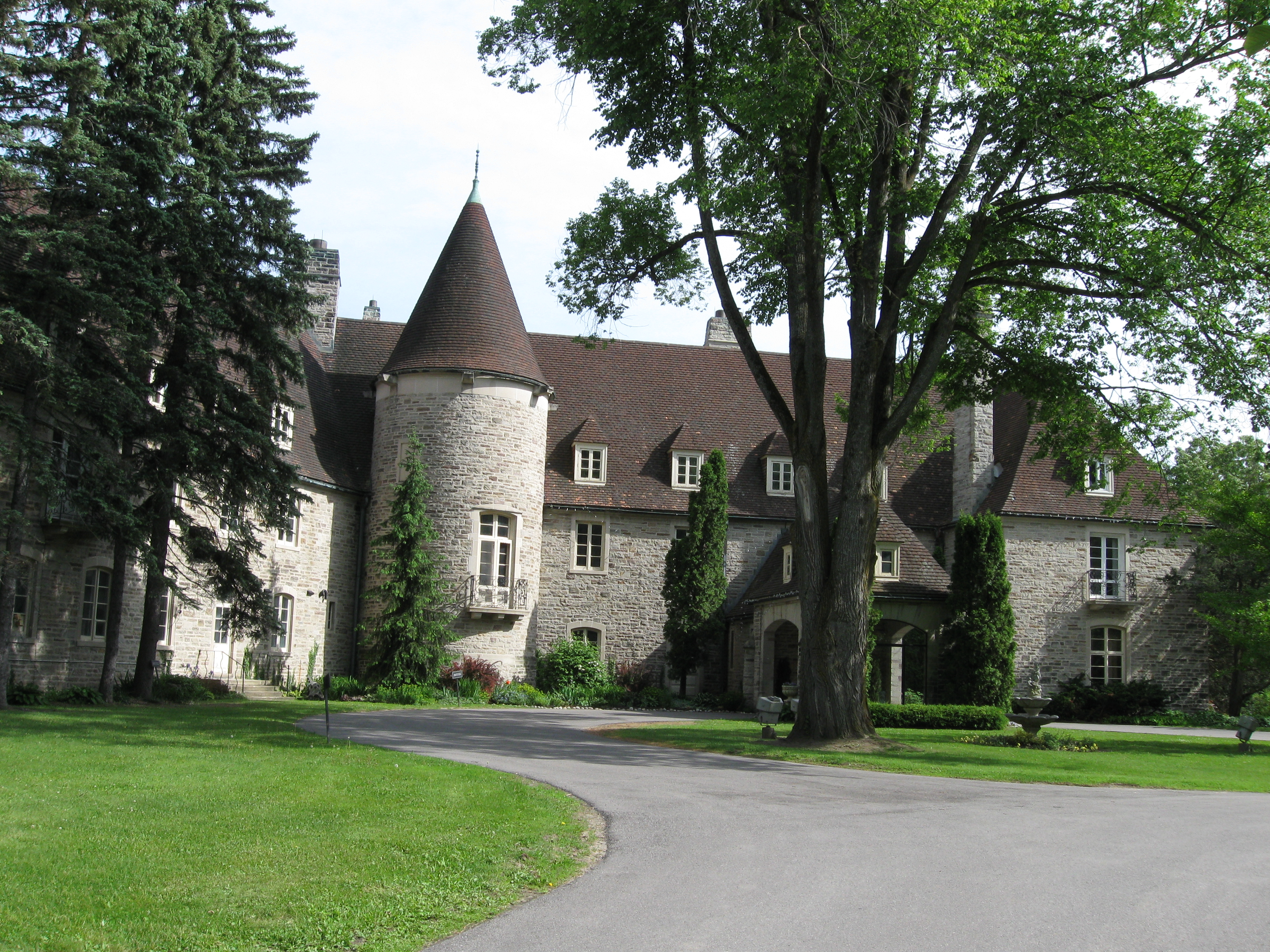

- Location within Ontario

General information
- Type: House
- Architectural style: Châteauesque
- Location: King City, Ontario, Canada
- Coordinates: 43.9615°N 79.5206°W
- Construction started: 1938
- Completed: 1939
- Governing body: Private

Technical details
- Floor area: 33,000 sq ft (3,100 m^{2})

Other information
- Number of rooms: 60

Eaton Hall is a large house in King City, Ontario, Canada, built in the Norman style for Lady Eaton in 1938–39 on a 700-acre (2.8 km²) parcel of land (partly the Ferguson farm). Lady Eaton and her husband, Sir John Craig Eaton acquired the land in 1920 and 1922 on recommendation from their friend Sir Henry Pellatt, who owned the nearby Mary Lake property. Lady Eaton moved into Eaton Hall three years after selling her city mansion, Ardwold. The house is adjacent to a body of water named Lake Jonda (a combination of the first three letters of her son John David Eaton's first and middle names), and nestled within the temperate forests of King Township. Upon completion, it contained 72 rooms. It became a beloved gathering place for the Eaton Family, owners of the Eaton's department stores based in Toronto.

== Architecture ==
Eaton Hall is a castle-like building constructed from Humber Valley limestone and roofed with red Ludowici tile. It features one square turret and two round turrets, one of which includes a grand spiral staircase. The building's exterior features a porte-cochere along with extensive ironwork and tall chimneys to add to the regal design. Contemporary architects described it as an adaption of a sixteenth-century Norman, Gothic, quasi-French château.

== History ==
Site plans and surveys for the property dating from 1921 to the 1930s all refer to its location being in Eversley, a community which no longer exists. Design was started in 1932 by architects Peter L. Allward and George Roper Gouinlock, son of architect George Wallace Gouinlock (later by firm Allward and Gouinlock). Construction was completed in 1939 and was supervised by John W. Bowser of the Aurora Building Company.

Flora Eaton was a member of the Toronto Hunt Club. In 1929, it split into the Eglinton Hunt Club and the Toronto and North York Hunt Club. Hunters of the latter held regular outings, meeting for breakfast at Eaton Hall, riding in the adjacent Pellatt Estate, then ending the day with an afternoon tea at Eaton Hall.

During World War II, the property was used as a convalescent hospital and rehabilitation centre for the Royal Canadian Navy. About 100 people were housed here starting in July 1944, but only a skeleton staff remained by Christmas 1945.

After Lady Eaton's death in 1970, the land was sold to Seneca College, which was then a provincially funded college of applied arts and technology. It established its King Campus operations on that land in 1971, using Eaton Hall as its administrative facility. In 1977, a new facility was built for the expanding college, and Eaton Hall became a Management Development Centre until 1991, at which time it was converted to a public hotel and conference centre.

A history of the estate, Eaton Hall: Pride of King Township, was written by local author and historian Kelly Mathews, published by The History Press, an imprint of Dundurn Press in June 2015.

In 2021, Seneca College and the municipal government of King signed an agreement in which the college granted a ground lease to the municipality for a nominal rate of $1 per year for 99 years in exchange for tax exemption and the use of the building for events and programs by the township's residents, community groups, and not-for-profit organizations. The building will be renovated to enable hosting special events such as conferences and weddings.

== Filming location ==
Many movies and television programs have been filmed at Eaton Hall, including Murdoch Mysteries, Death Weekend, Mrs. Winterbourne, and the final scene of the award-winning film A History of Violence.
