= Flora Eaton =

Canadian socialite, philanthropist and nurse

Lady Eaton
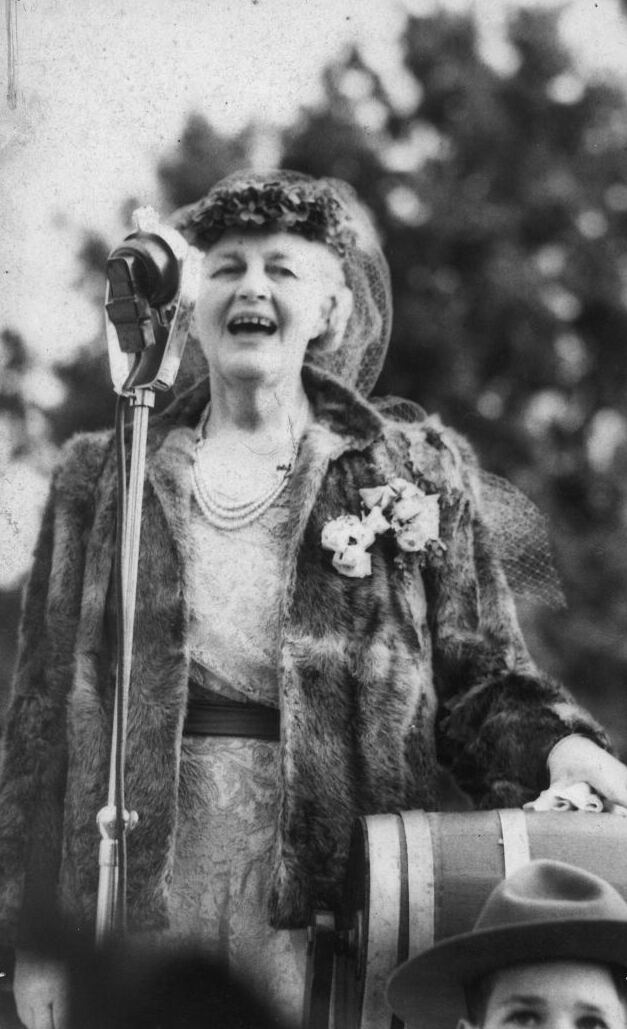
- Lady Eaton, c. 1933
- Born: Sarah Evelyn Florence McCrea; 26 November 1879; Omemee, Victoria County, Ontario, Canada
- Died: 9 July 1970 (aged 90); Toronto, Ontario, Canada
- Resting place: Eaton Mausoleum, Mount Pleasant Cemetery, Toronto
- Spouse: Sir John Craig Eaton (m. 1901; died 1922)
- Children: 6, including Timothy Craig Eaton and John David Eaton

Flora, Lady Eaton (born Sarah Evelyn Florence McCrea; 26 November 1879 – 9 July 1970) was a Canadian socialite, philanthropist, and nurse. As the wife of Sir John Craig Eaton, who inherited the Eaton's department store business, she was a member and later matriarch of the prominent Eaton family.

== Early life and family ==
She was born in 1879 in the village of Omemee, Ontario, a small community in Victoria County (today part of the City of Kawartha Lakes), approximately 23 km (14 mi) west of Peterborough. She was the youngest of eight children born to Irish Protestant immigrants – John McCrea, a cabinetmaker, and Jane McNeely.

She moved to Toronto and became a nurse, first at Toronto General Hospital then at Rotherham House, a private hospital on Sherbourne Street. While working at Rotherham House, she met John Craig Eaton, a patient who was a younger son of Eaton's department store founder Timothy Eaton. The two were married in Omemee on 8 May 1901.

They had five biological children – Timothy Craig Eaton (1903–1986), John David Eaton (1906–1973), Edgar Allison Eaton (1912–1988), Gilbert McCrea Eaton (1915–1985) and Florence Mary Eaton (1919–2012) – and adopted one daughter, Evlyn Beatrice Eaton (1920–1989).

The Eatons built a massive Georgian Revival style mansion on Spadina Road around 1910. Named Ardwold, the Gaelic word for "high, green hill", the house was designed by Frank Wickson and was one of the most lavish ever constructed in Toronto. The couple also built a vacation home named Kawandag at the northern end of Lake Rosseau in Muskoka, and that site is now the location of Rosseau Lake College.

In 1915, during World War I, her husband was knighted in recognition of his contributions to the war effort; he became Sir John Craig Eaton, and she was henceforth known as Lady Eaton. She was active in charity work during the war, hosting fundraisers at Ardwold and serving as patroness of the 109th Battalion of the Canadian Expeditionary Force based at Lindsay, Ontario, near her hometown.

== Widowhood ==
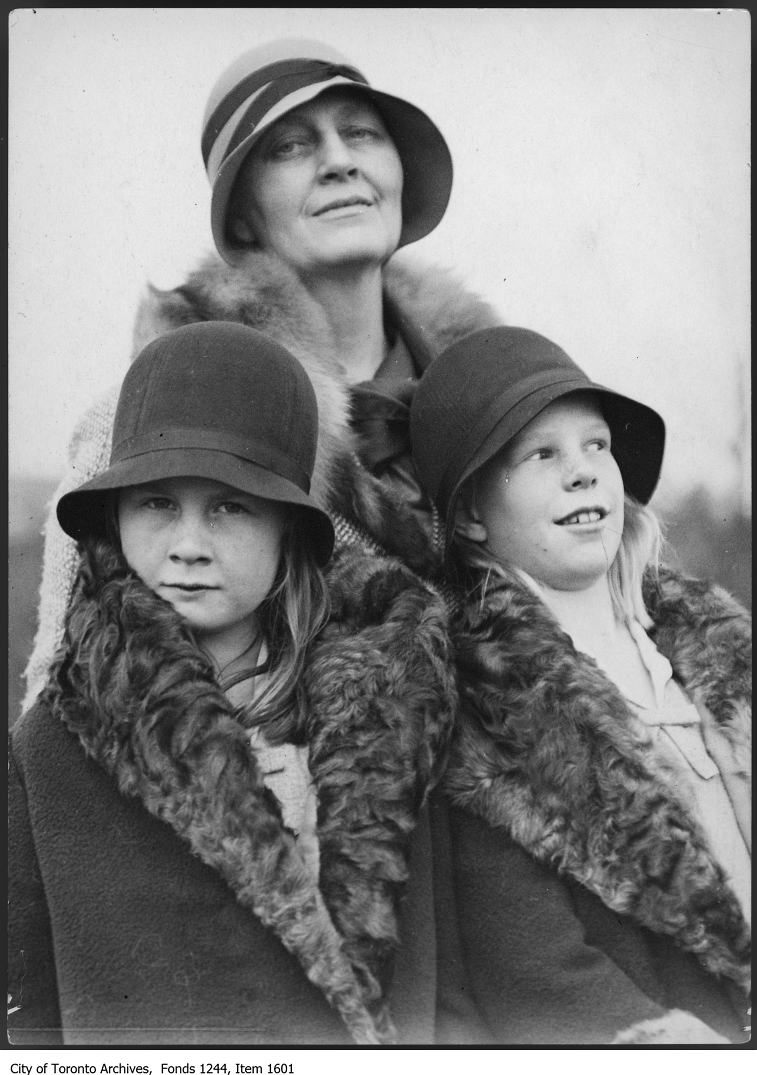
Lady Eaton with her daughters, Florence and Evlyn, at a meeting of the Toronto Hunt Club, c. 1930

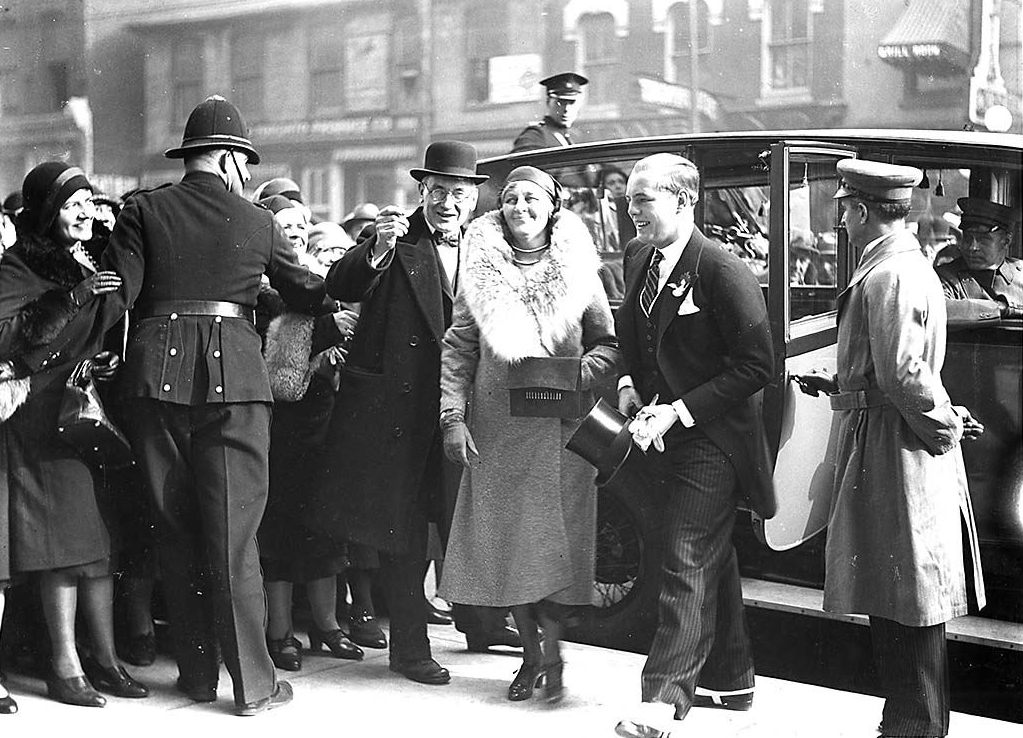
Lady Eaton and her son John David Eaton at the opening of Eaton's College Street, 30 October 1930

Lady Eaton was widowed in 1922 when her husband died of influenza at the age of 45. In 1919, prior to his death, Sir John and Lady Eaton had purchased a plot of land in King City, Ontario, near the Marylake estate of their friends, Sir Henry and Lady Pellatt. By the mid-1930s, Lady Eaton grew tired of Ardwold and found it too grand, so she built a Norman Revival château known as Eaton Hall on the King City property. The contents of Ardwold were auctioned off and the mansion was demolished with dynamite, as its walls were too thick for conventional demolition.

In her widowhood, Lady Eaton often spent the winters travelling through Europe. In the late 1920s, she purchased Villa Natalia, a villa in Fiesole outside Florence, which was built for Queen Elisabeth of Romania. In 1933, Lady Eaton was presented at court, and later that same year, she presented her future daughter-in-law, Signy Stefansson. In 1937, she attended the coronation of King George VI and Queen Elizabeth, and she presented her daughters Florence and Evlyn at court.

During her son's minority, Eaton's was run by Robert Young Eaton, a cousin of her husband. Lady Eaton disliked him and looked down on his branch of the family, whom she called the "worker Eatons", compared to her branch of the family, who were the "owner Eatons". She sat on the board of directors and took an active role in the company, overseeing the development of restaurants, most notably the Georgian Room at the Queen Street store, Eaton's Seventh Floor Restaurant at the College Street store and Eaton's Ninth Floor Restaurant in Montreal. The latter two were built in the Art Deco style by French architect Jacques Carlu.

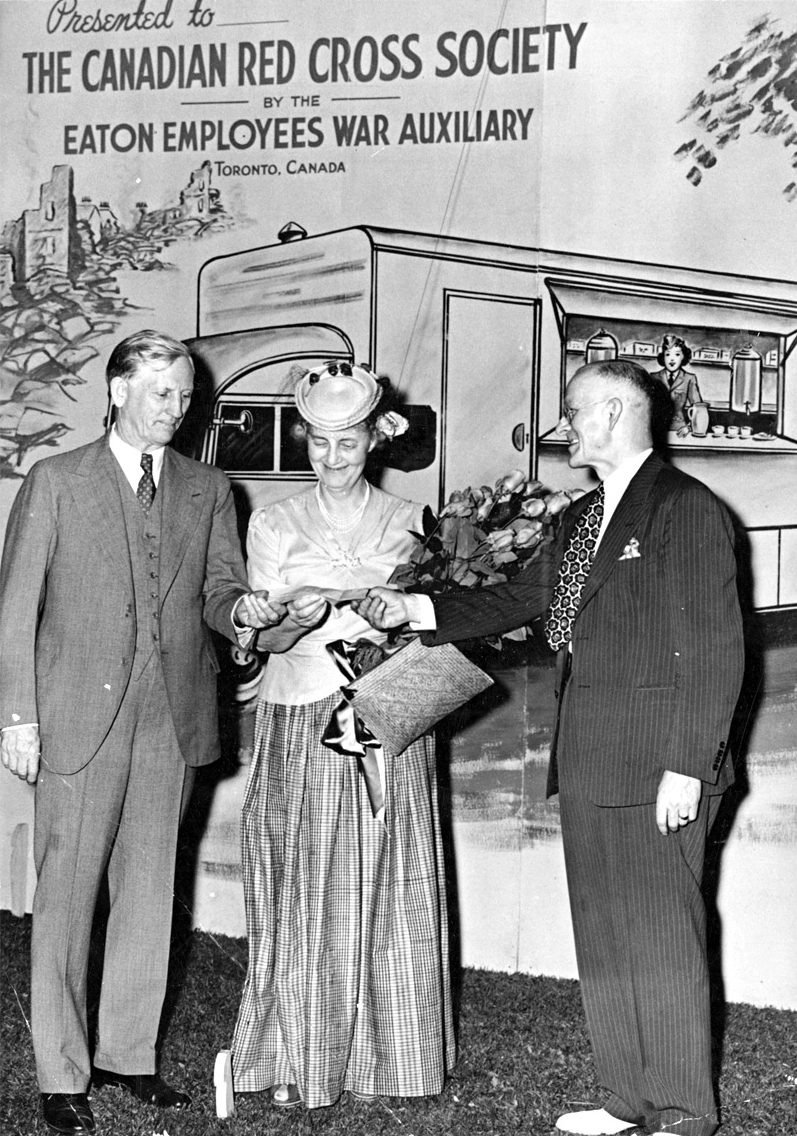
Lady Eaton presents a cheque to the Canadian Red Cross at a benefit at Eaton Hall, 1941

On her many visits to Britain, Lady Eaton became fascinated by the liturgical pageantry of the Church of England. She incorporated some elements of the Anglican church (such as clerical vestments, kneelers, and candelabra) into services at Timothy Eaton Memorial Church. These changes were met with objection by the minister and other congregants, who argued that this pomp was not part of the United Church of Canada, with its roots in Methodism. However, due to the influence that Lady Eaton held, the changes went ahead. In 1938, she funded a renovation of the chancel in memory of her late husband, which made the floorplan closer to an Anglican church than that of a Methodist one.

During World War II, Lady Eaton housed evacuated British children at Eaton Hall, and they referred to her as "Auntie Flora". After the war, the house became a convalescent home for the Royal Canadian Navy for a time before becoming Lady Eaton's private residence again. She hosted a banquet for Eaton's employees returning from the front in September 1946. She also hosted an annual soirée for Eaton's managers and their wives. She was vice-president of the Canadian Red Cross, Master of the Toronto Hunt Club and was involved with the Canadian National Institute for the Blind, the Art Gallery of Ontario, and the Canadian National Committee for Mental Hygiene.

In 1950, in recognition of her charity work, Lady Eaton was made a Dame of the Most Venerable Order of the Hospital of St. John of Jerusalem. In the 1940s and 1950s, a false rumour persisted that Lady Eaton was the inventor of red velvet cake, which was sold in the store's bakery. At the height of the store's success, Lady Eaton was popularly known as "Mrs. Canada".

Interested in the occult, Lady Eaton had a séance room built in the turret of Eaton Hall. The ceiling of this circular room is painted with the zodiac.

As her health failed, Lady Eaton moved from Eaton Hall to her secondary residence on Old Forest Hill Road in Toronto's Forest Hill neighbourhood. She died at home on 9 July 1970, at the age of 90. Her funeral was held on July 15 at Timothy Eaton Memorial Church. She was interred in the Eaton Mausoleum at Mount Pleasant Cemetery.

== Legacy ==
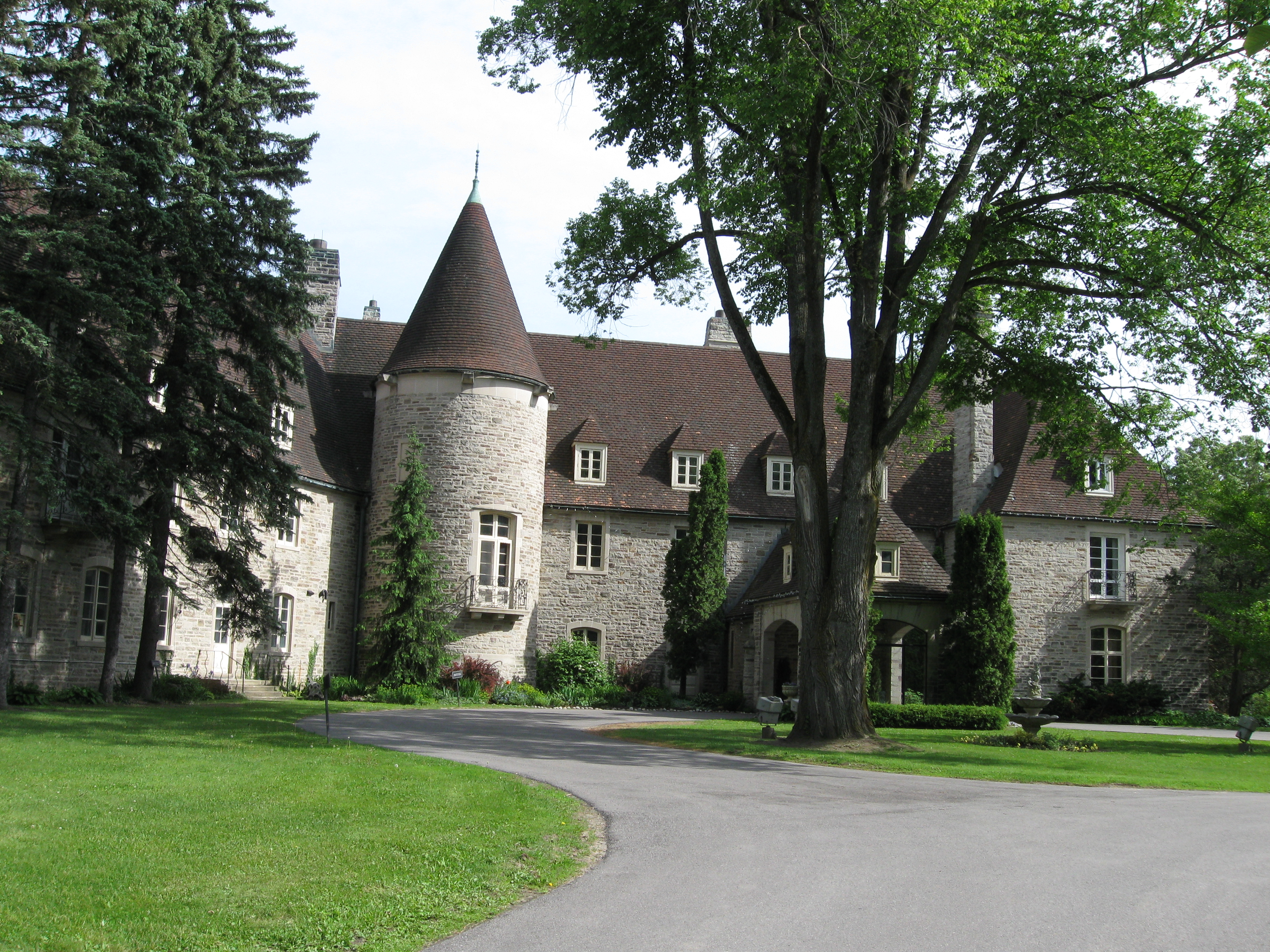
Eaton Hall, 2009

Lady Eaton's legacy is still felt to this day, particularly in her hometown of Omemee and surrounding area. Lady Eaton Elementary School in the village and Lady Eaton College at Trent University in nearby Peterborough are named in her honour. The Eatons donated Coronation Hall, Omemee's municipal building, in 1911, and a manse and pipe organ to Trinity United Church. The family proposed that the village change its name to Eatonville, but the offer was refused.

After her death, Eaton Hall became the King Campus of Seneca College. The house became home to the college's administrative offices and later its Management Development Centre until 1991. The college continues to make use of the grounds while the house is now a hotel and conference centre.

The current campus of Rosseau Lake College sits upon lands formerly owned by the Eatons. While many buildings on campus fell victim to fire, several original structures still remain.

In 1994, Royal Doulton produced a figurine in Lady Eaton's image to celebrate the 125th anniversary of Eaton's. Limited to a production of 2,500, each figurine was marked with its production sequence.

The oldest endowed chair at the University of Toronto and first full-time professorship of medicine in the British Empire, the Sir John and Lady Eaton Professor and Chair of Medicine, is named after her and her husband. It was established in 1919 and endowed by their $500,000 donation.
