= Statue of Timothy Eaton =

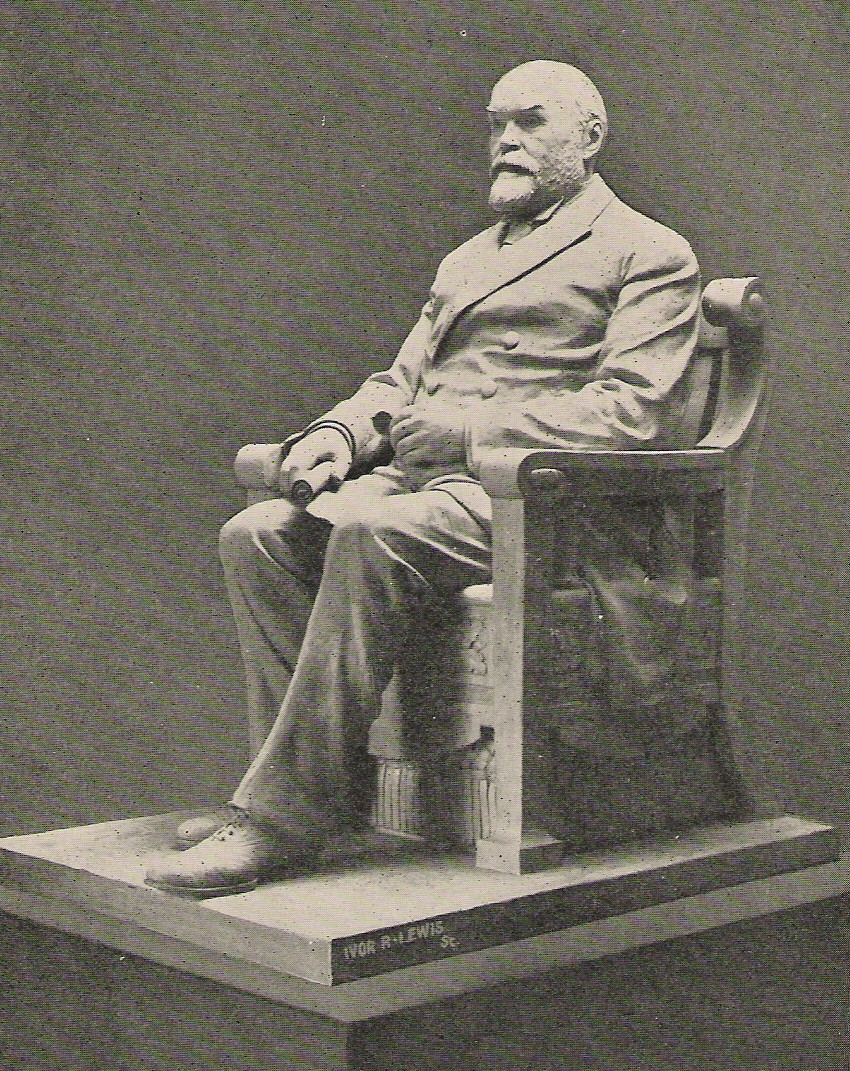
Toronto bronze statue of Timothy Eaton in 1919. This statue now sits in the Royal Ontario Museum in Toronto, and another casting sits in the MTS Centre in Winnipeg.

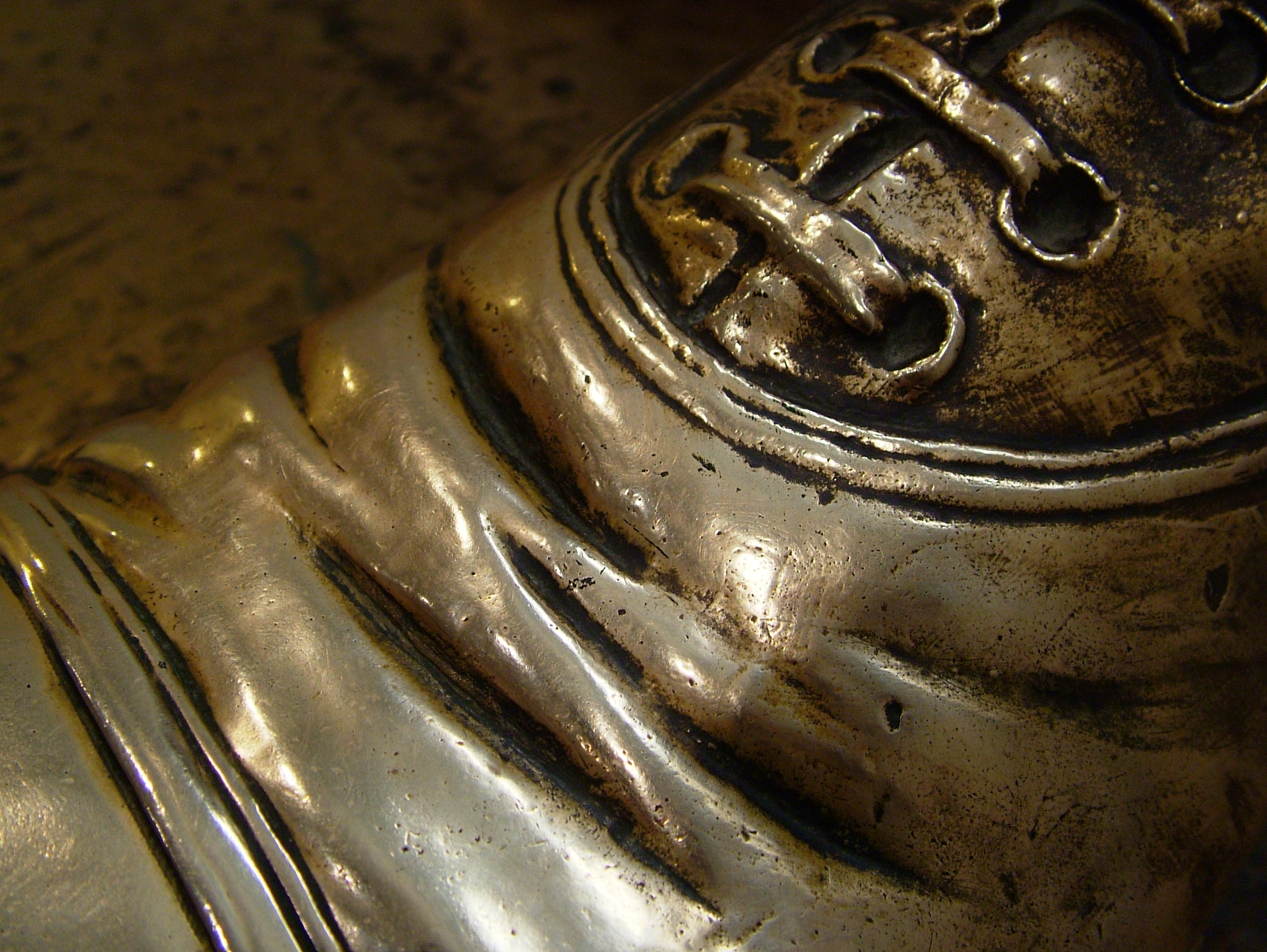
The famous left shoe

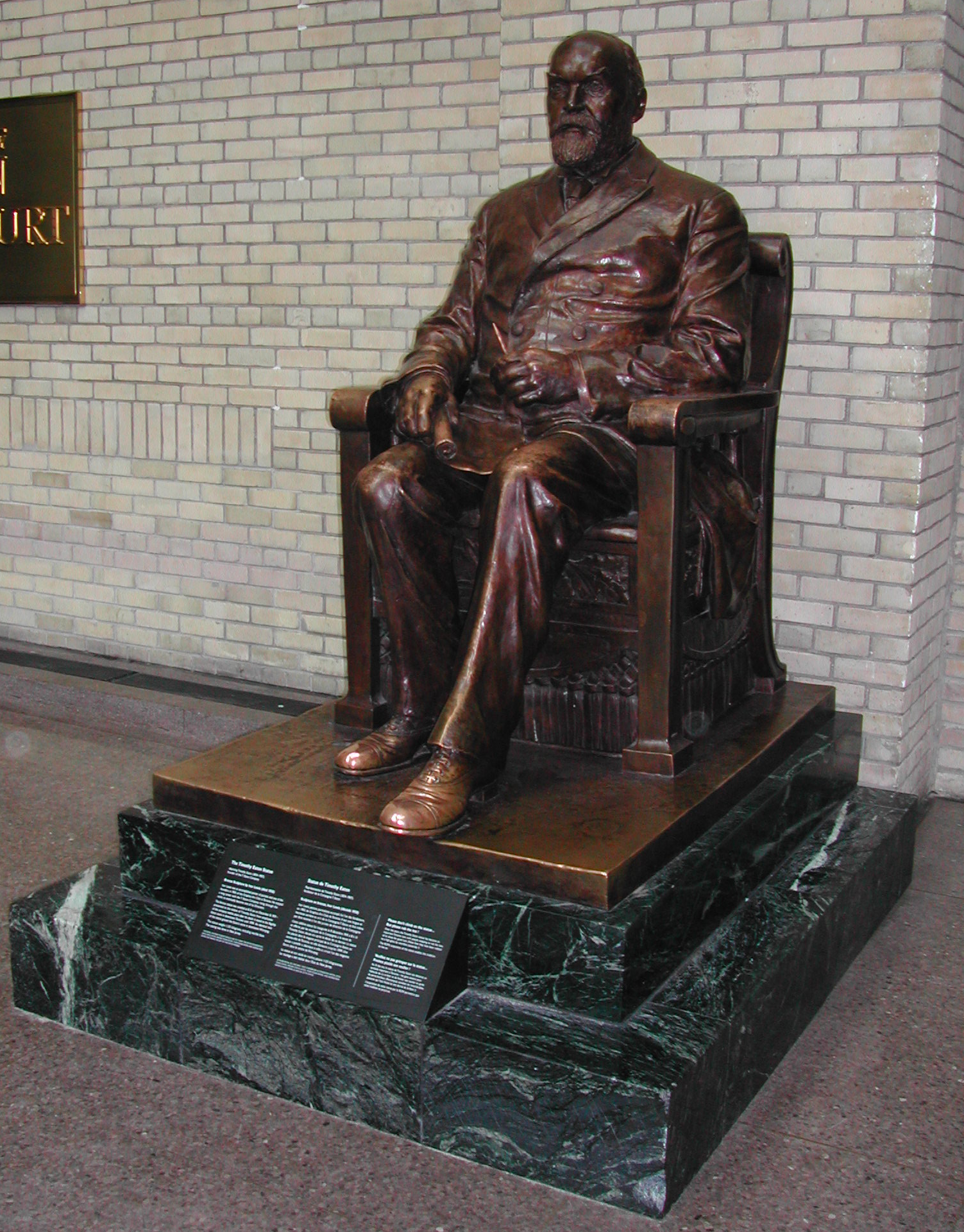
The Toronto statue in Eaton Court

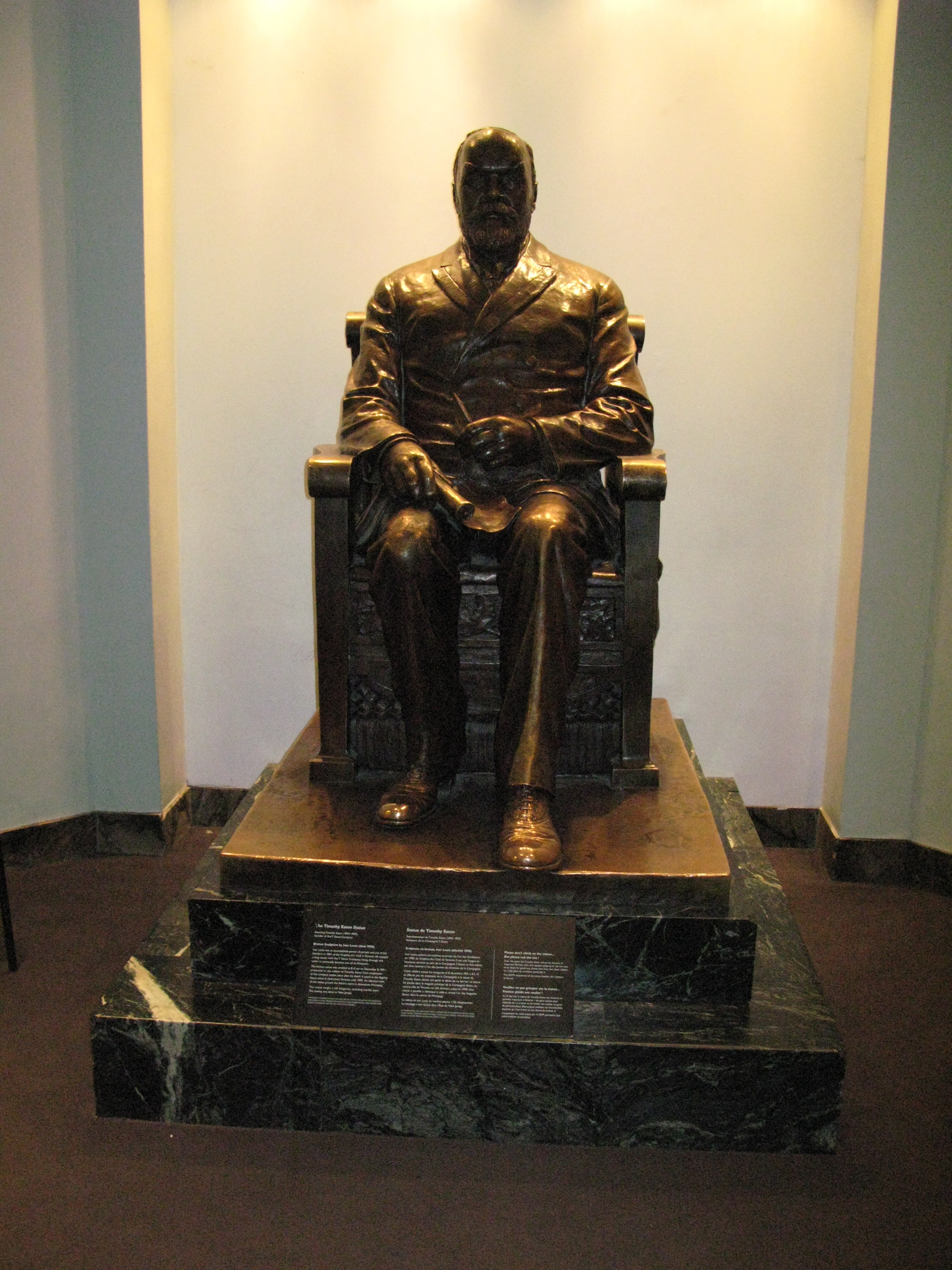
The Toronto statue in the Lower Rotunda of the ROM.

There are two castings of the well-known statue of Timothy Eaton, the famous Canadian retailer: one in Toronto, Ontario (43°40′04″N 79°23′41″W), the other in Winnipeg, Manitoba (49°53′34″N 97°8′37″W).

== History ==
In 1919, employees of the Eaton's department store presented the Eaton family with a special gift, in honour of the store's 50th anniversary. The First World War had just ended, and Eaton's, unlike many employers, had made a pledge to all of its employees serving overseas that their jobs, or jobs of equal value, would be waiting for them when they returned home. Married men who enlisted voluntarily received full pay for the duration of the war, while single men who enlisted voluntarily received half-pay. Men serving in the field regularly received parcels from their pre-war employer, containing coffee, chocolate, socks and other items from the shelves of the Eaton's stores. Moreover, Eaton's donated all profits from its many government war contracts back to the war drive. This corporate generosity and loyalty during trying times engendered much affection for the Eaton family from its thousands of employees, and in gratitude the employees presented the two bronze statues to the family, on the occasion of the chain's golden jubilee and in tribute to the store's founder.

The employees commissioned Ivor Lewis (1882–1958), from the Eaton's advertising department, to create the statues. Two castings were made: one for the main store in Toronto, and one for the Winnipeg store. The Toronto statue was unveiled on December 8, 1919, with thousands of employees in attendance. The Eaton Choral Society sang "O Canada", and the statue was presented to Margaret Eaton and John Craig Eaton, Timothy Eaton's widow and son respectively. A similar unveiling took place in Winnipeg on December 11, 1919.

== Landmarks ==
The two statues greeted shoppers in their respective stores for decades, serving as both a meeting place and a local landmark. Over time, the tradition developed of rubbing Timothy's left toe for good luck. As countless shoppers rubbed the toe on a daily basis, one bronze foot was always a golden colour compared to the darker shade of the rest of the statue.

The Toronto statue stood for years inside the Main Store at Yonge and Queen streets. When the Main Store was demolished in the late 1970s to make way for the Toronto Eaton Centre, the statue was moved to the Dundas Street entrance of the chain's new flagship store. The Winnipeg statue stood for eight decades in the downtown store on Portage Avenue.

== Bankruptcy of the Eaton's chain ==
When the Eaton's chain declared bankruptcy in 1999, countless television news stories commenced their coverage with shots of the Timothy Eaton statue. Flowers and cards were left at the base of both the Toronto and Winnipeg statues, in condolence of the end of a Canadian institution. When Sears Canada acquired many of the corporate assets of the Eaton's chain, there was a brief legal tussle between Sears and the Eaton family over ownership of the statues. Eventually, litigation was averted when the family presented documents certifying that ownership of the statues vested with the family, not the defunct chain. Soon thereafter, the Toronto statue was moved to the Royal Ontario Museum, where it stood in the museum's Eaton Court.

In 2005, as part of the Royal Ontario Museum renovations, the statue was moved to a new location in the Lower Rotunda of the museum, outside the Signy & Cléophée Eaton Theatre.

The fate of the Winnipeg statue generated more controversy. The Eaton family agreed that the statue would be moved to the Polo Park Shopping Centre, where Eaton's had years earlier opened its first suburban location in Manitoba and where Sears would be opening the only Winnipeg location of its short-lived "eatons" experiment. In 2002, Sears announced the end of the eatons mini-chain, and the Polo Park store was slated for conversion to an outlet of Eaton's historic rival, the Bay department store. Fred Eaton made arrangements for the statue to be moved to St. Mary's, Ontario, the site of one of Timothy Eaton's first stores. Heritage advocates and a group of former Winnipeg Eaton's employees sought to have the statue remain in Winnipeg. On October 22, 2002, the Manitoba government designated the statue as a protected provincial heritage object, with the cooperation of the Eaton family. It was placed in the concourse of the city's new hockey arena, now known as Canada Life Centre which stands on the site of the now-demolished downtown Eaton's store.

Museum-goers in Toronto and hockey fans in Winnipeg continue to rub Timothy's toe for luck. While ROM generally discourages visitors from physically touching its artifacts, an exception is made for the statue, as the accompanying plaque invites museum visitors to partake in the tradition.
