= IOOF Hall (Toronto) =

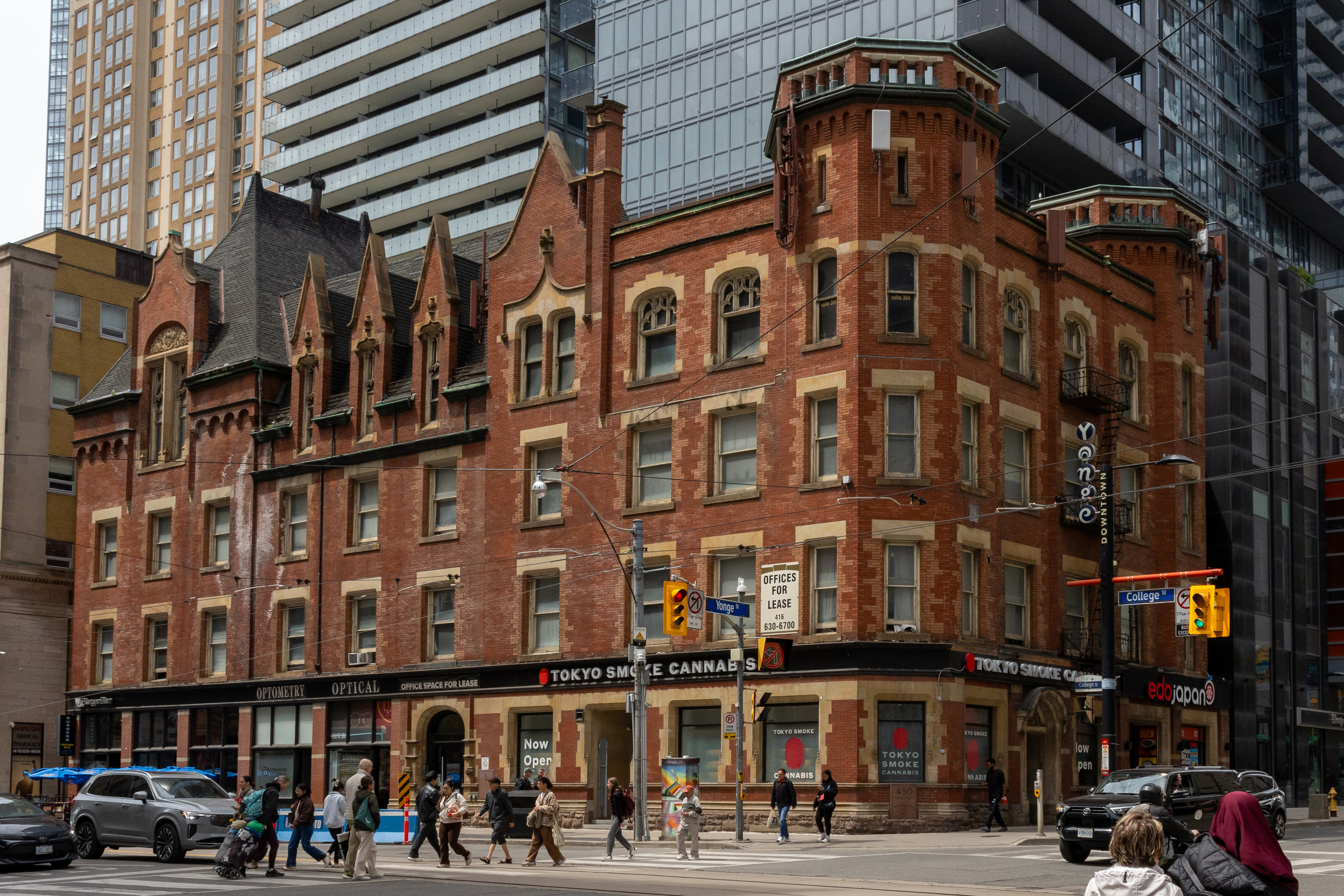
- IOOF Hall in 2026

- Location within Ontario
- 43°39′41.56″N 79°23′0.16″W
- Location: Toronto

The IOOF Hall in Toronto is a historic building erected for the Independent Order of Odd Fellows society. The building was designed for mix-use accommodating over 34 offices, a store selling imported and domestic cigars, and most importantly a 20’ wide by 46’ long grand hall for private meetings held by Toronto’s Independent Order of Odd Fellows. It was the first society hall in Toronto to be built with an electrically run elevator running up from the ground floor to the 3rd floor society rooms.

Oddfellows’ Hall is located on the northwest corner of Yonge Street and College Street, in Toronto, ON. The building was designed as an adaptation of the Gothic Revival style by Norman Dick and Frank Wickson in 1891 and was completed in 1893.
