= Omemee, Ontario =

Omemee
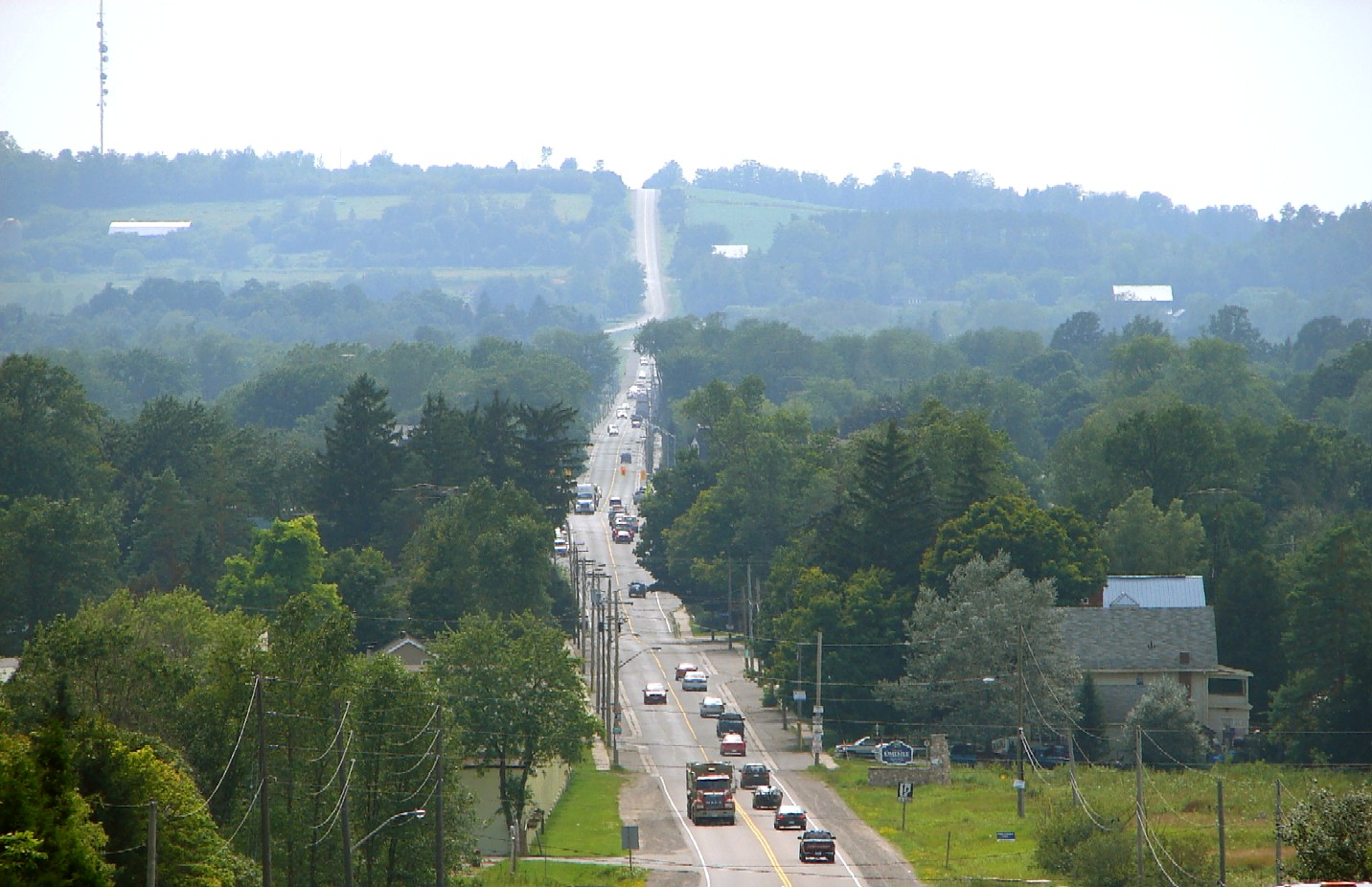
- Highway 7 in Omemee

- Location within City of Kawartha Lakes Location within Southern Ontario
- Coordinates: 44°18′N 78°33′W
- Country: Canada
- Province: Ontario

Area
  - Total: 2.39 km^{2} (0.92 sq mi)

Population (2011)
  - Total: 1,247
- Time zone: UTC-5 (Eastern (EST))
  - Summer (DST): UTC-4 (EDT)

Omemee is a community within the city of Kawartha Lakes, Ontario, Canada, formerly known as Victoria County. The community had a population of 1,247 in the Canada 2011 Census. It is located between the city of Peterborough and the community of Lindsay. Lindsay is the largest population centre in the city of Kawartha Lakes, and serves as the administrative centre as it did with Victoria County.

== History ==
The community that grew up around William Cottingham's mills on the Pigeon River was first called Williamstown and then Metcalfe. In 1857 the community was renamed Omemee, for the Omemee tribe, which once hunted in the area. The word means pigeon in the Mississauga language, and is traditionally spelled “omiimii”.

The construction of the Port Hope, Lindsay and Beaverton Railway in 1857 (when the town also acquired a post office) fostered the growth of the community, which became a thriving shipping point for timber and grain.

Until the 1860s, Omemee competed with Lindsay as the largest town in Victoria County. At its zenith in the late 1800s, Omemee had a grist mill, two sawmills, a tannery, a foundry, a shingle mill, a cloth mill, three churches, four hotels, an elementary and secondary school, and a newspaper.

As Ontario’s economy shifted away from agriculture and surrounding towns grew, the industrial section of Omemee declined until, 100 years later, only the Regal Stationery Company remained (the factory has since closed). Today, Omemee’s economy is supported by the town’s population as well as seasonal residents and retirement communities in the surrounding area.

In late 2014, Omemee’s Youngtown museum closed for good and shipped its content to the neighbouring town of Lindsay for display.

In August 2016, Omemee was featured on Canadian comedian Jonny Harris’s CBC Still Standing program. Filmed at Thanksgiving the year prior, in the town's city hall, the episode focused on Neil Young and his childhood friend, taking rifle shooting lessons from the town doctor and going adventure diving in a swimming pool.

== Education ==
Omemee has one public school: Scott Young Public School (c. 1993), named after Scott Young, a journalist and author of many books, and father of musician Neil Young.

In 2015 due to enrollment decline in Scott Young Middle school, “to the point where both schools were below 50 per cent Ministry of Education identified capacity”, the Trillium Lakelands District School Board moved the overflow of grade 4’s from Lady Eaton over to Scott Young. Then in late 2016 it was announced that Lady Eaton Elementary school will close for good in June 2018.

Though Lady Eaton is to be closed, there are plans to keep the daycare open to the public: “the board [can] work with the Omemee Children’s Centre in the hopes of moving the daycare to Scott Young”.

== Legacy ==
The ghost town of Omemee, North Dakota, was named after the Ontario Omemee, as the former's first post master hailed from the latter.

In 1970, Crosby, Stills, Nash & Young released Déjà Vu with a recording of the song "Helpless". The song refers to Omemee, Neil Young's hometown: “There is a town in north Ontario ... All my changes were there”.

== Notable people ==
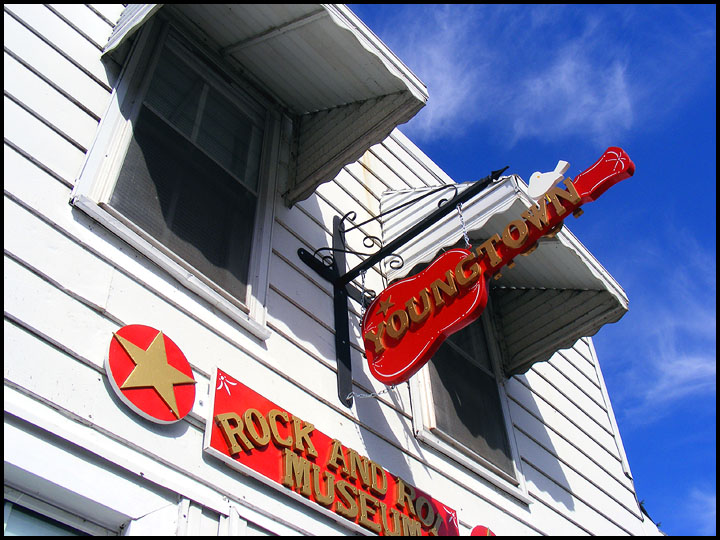
The Neil Young Museum

- John W. Carroll, an Illinois politician and newspaper publisher, was born in Omemee.
- Charles Norris Cochrane, the historian and philosopher, was born there.
- Walter H. Cottingham, general manager and later president of Sherwin-Williams.
- Lady Eaton: Flora McRae Eaton, wife of Sir John Craig Eaton, the president and heir of the Eaton's department store chain in Canada, during her childhood. The Eaton family donated many buildings to Omemee, including Coronation Hall (George V), Trinity United Church Manse, and also the organ for Trinity United church. Lady Eaton Elementary School was named in her honour.
- Jules Sobrian, medical doctor, competitive marksman and author, who immigrated to Canada at the age of 21 and resides in Omemee, Ontario. Sobrian began shooting competitively at Hart House Revolver Club at the University of Toronto while studying medicine. He has competed for Canada in pistol-shooting events at four Olympic Games. His most noteworthy contribution to Omemee was being the village doctor for almost 50 years.
- Neil Young, musician, during his childhood and since 2021.
- Scott Young, writer and sportscaster, father of Neil Young owned a farm property during his second period back in the area.
