= John W. Bowser =

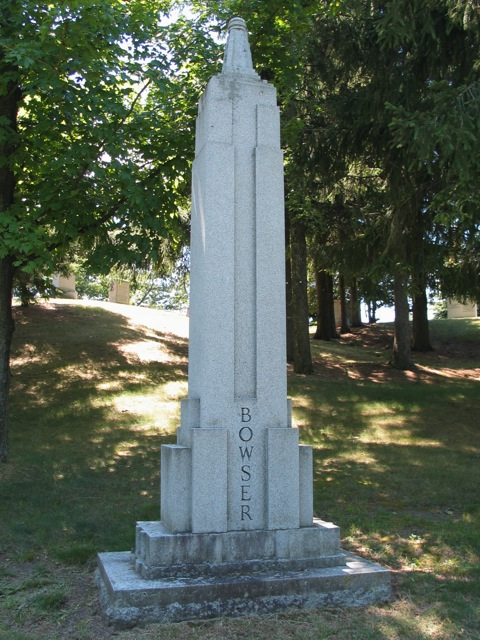
John W. Bowser gravestone

John W. Bowser (1892–1956) was a Canadian construction engineer, most notably the project construction superintendent for the Empire State Building.

Bowser was born in Whitchurch township, Ontario, Canada, present-day Aurora in 1892. He left home at age 11, returning to the Toronto area at age 15, then working on several construction jobs including a tunnel to connect Eaton's store with the Annex, the Royal Ontario Museum, and the Bank of Toronto building. Hired by an American firm, he was sent to Tokyo. Later, he was responsible for the demolition of old Madison Square Gardens, and the Waldorf-Astoria Hotel.

Bowser returned to Canada after completing the Empire State Building ahead of schedule, thereafter remaining active in construction, and overseeing ship building during World War II. The construction of Eaton Hall, today part of Seneca College was one project. He also built much of the Canadian Army camp in Newmarket during World War II. The camp was pulled down at war's end but the PMQs (married quarters), drill hall and the officers mess still stand. The PMQs are private homes on Arthur St. and surrounding streets, the drill hall is the Newmarket Curling Club and the officers mess is the Royal Canadian Legion on Srigley St. 'Jack' had a construction company in Aurora called ABC, Aurora Building Corp. which he ran until his death in 1956.

Buried in Aurora, Ontario his grave notably has a 10-foot-high (3.0 m) replica of the Empire State Building as a marker.

John Bowser Crescent in Newmarket, Ontario is named for him.
