= Ardwold =

House in Toronto

Coordinates: 43.679104°N 79.407043°W

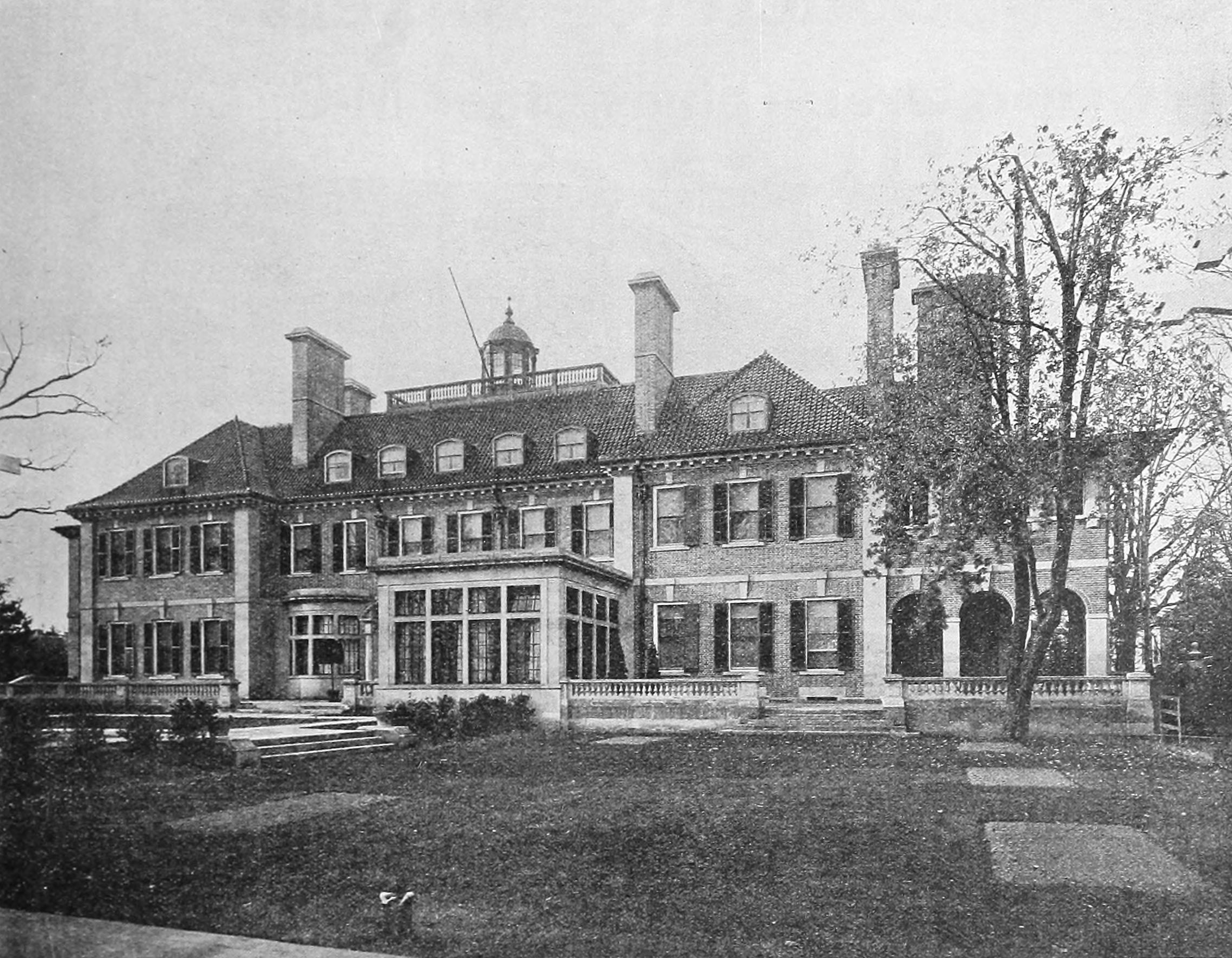

General information
- Location: 480 Davenport Road, Toronto, Ontario
- Year built: 1909-10
- Demolished: 1936
- Owner: John Craig Eaton

Design and construction
- Architects: Wickson & Gregg

Ardwold was the residence of Sir John Craig Eaton and Lady Eaton of Toronto, Ontario, Canada. Sir John was the youngest son of Timothy Eaton, the founder of the T. Eaton Company Department Store, or Eaton's, and he inherited the business and became its president upon his father's death in 1907. Sir John was one of the wealthiest men in Canada, and in 1909 he commissioned a home to be built on "The Hill", a name used to describe the neighbourhood on the Davenport Hill in Toronto where many wealthy families built their homes. Casa Loma, built by Henry Pellatt and the largest private house ever constructed in Canada, was near Ardwold, as were Spadina House, the mansion of James Austin, and Glenedyth, the estate of Samuel Nordheimer.

Ardwold is a Gaelic term meaning "high, green hill". The enormous mansion was designed by Toronto architect Frank Wickson of Wickson and Gregg Architectural firm. It was in the Georgian style, and influenced by English and Irish country homes, namely Belton House in Lincolnshire. Ardwold had 50 rooms, 14 bathrooms, and its own hospital. Situated on eleven acres (45,0

00 m^{2}) of landscaped grounds, which included a half-acre (2,000 m^{2}) glassed area housing a conservatory and swimming pool, Ardwold was one of the largest and most luxurious residences in Toronto and the country.

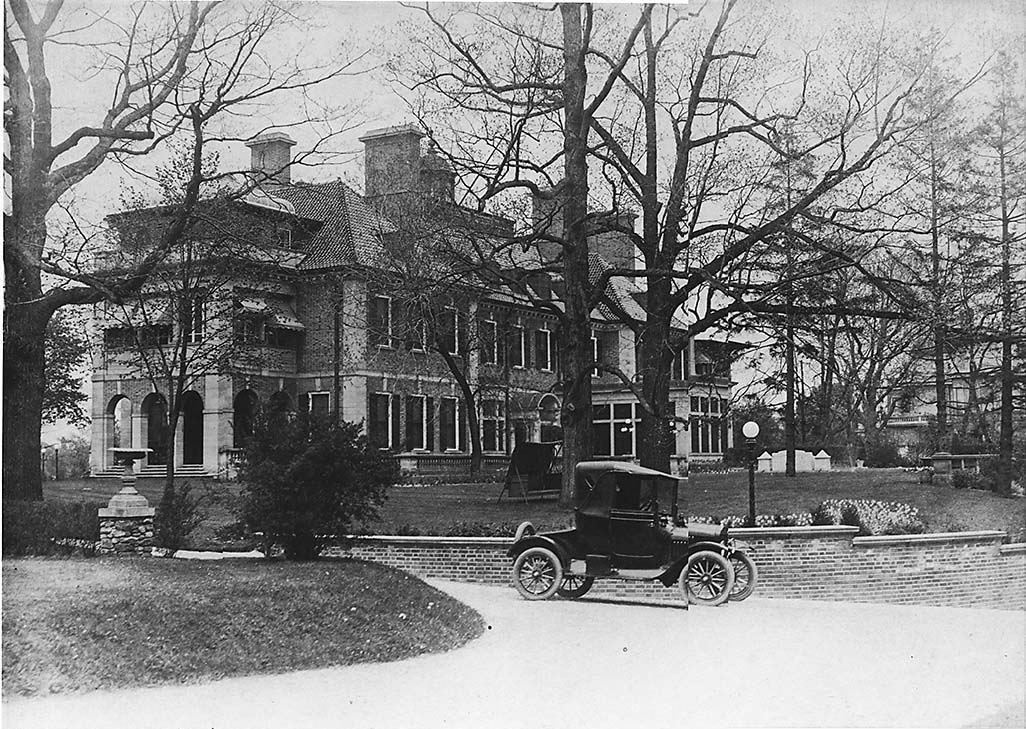
Ardwold, circa 1910

Sir John Craig Eaton died in 1922, and his widow Lady Eaton kept the home until 1936, when she sold the land. Eaton moved to the enormous chateau named Eaton Hall at King City, Ontario. After an auction of much of its contents, Ardwold was blown up (the walls were too thick to use ordinary demolition methods). The property was divided into an exclusive housing development named Ardwold Gate. Only the gate lodge on Spadina Road near Austin Terrace remains.
