= Nancy Eaton =

Canadian heiress and murder victim (1961 – 1985)

- Born: Nancy Alice Edward Eaton; May 28, 1961
- Died: January 21, 1985 (aged 23); Toronto, Ontario, Canada
- Cause of death: Stab wound
- Burial place: Mount Pleasant Cemetery, Toronto
- Parents: Edward Eaton (father); Nancy Eaton Sr. (mother)

Nancy Alice Edward Eaton (May 28, 1961 – January 21, 1985) was a Canadian heiress and a member of the prominent Eaton family. She was the great-great-granddaughter of Timothy Eaton, founder of Eaton's, a Canadian department store chain. She was the only daughter of Edward Eaton and Nancy Leigh (Gossage) Eaton of Toronto.

On January 21, 1985, Eaton was stabbed twenty-one times and then raped in her Farnham Street apartment in Toronto. An acquaintance of Eaton's, Ernest John Andrew Leyshon-Hughes, who was himself a member of the prominent Canadian Osler family, admitted to murdering her. He was found not guilty by reason of insanity. He was indefinitely remanded to the custody of The Ontario Review Board.

== Murder ==
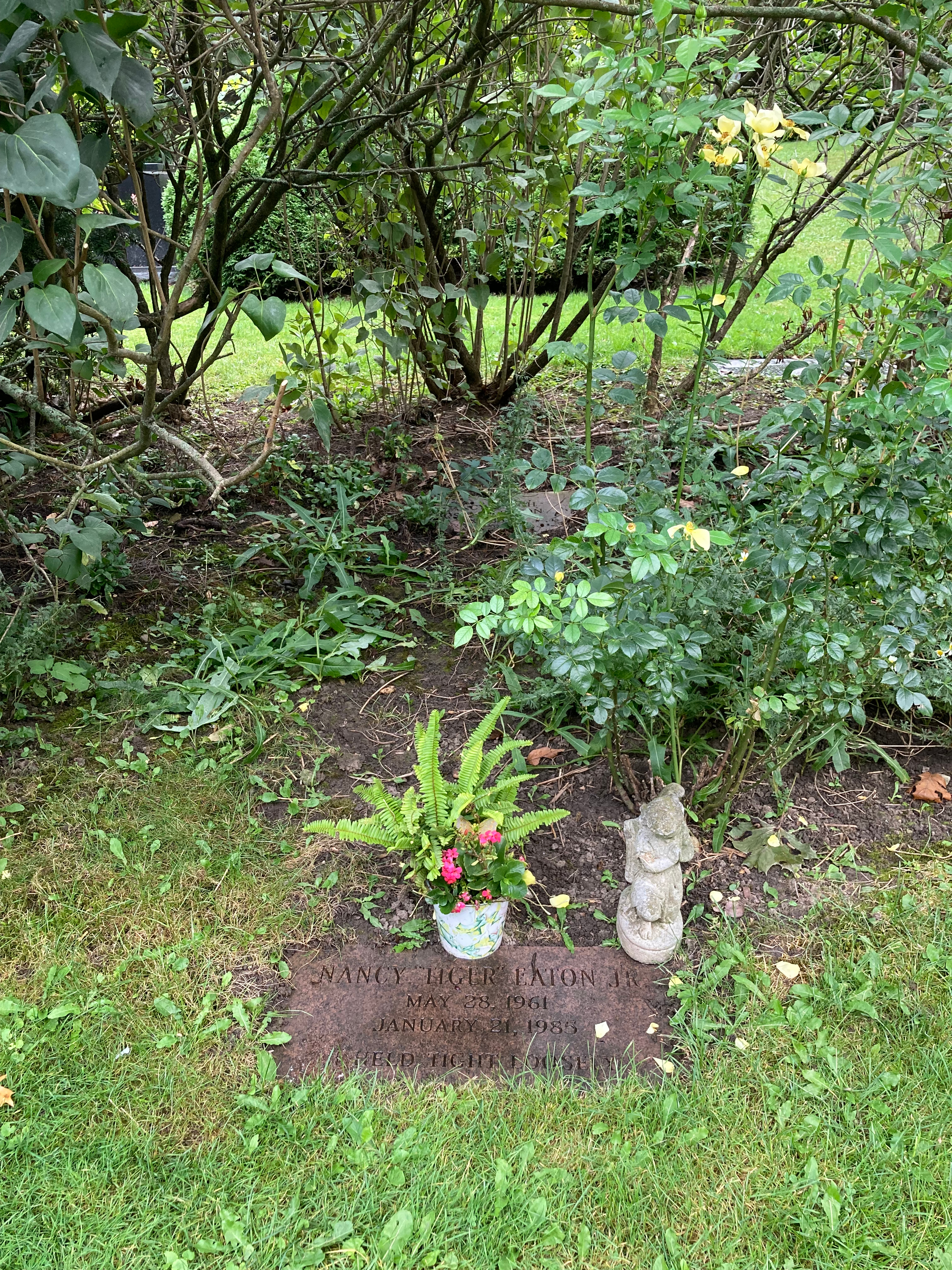
Eaton's grave at Mount Pleasant Cemetery

On January 21, 1985, Eaton was stabbed twenty-one times and then raped in her Farnham Street apartment in Toronto. An acquaintance of Eaton's, Ernest John Andrew Leyshon-Hughes, also known as Andrew Leyshon-Hughes, who was himself a member of the prominent Canadian Osler family, admitted to murdering her, but was found not guilty by reason of insanity. He was indefinitely remanded to the custody of The Ontario Review Board. In February 2001, Leyshon-Hughes was living at the Royal Ottawa Hospital and was a student at Algonquin College. In 2005, Leyshon-Hughes was discharged from the psychiatric hospital into the community.

Eaton was buried at Mount Pleasant Cemetery in Toronto.

== In popular culture ==
In 2003, the television movie The Death and Life of Nancy Eaton was released. Jessica Paré played the part of Nancy. It airs on LMN in the United States and is based on the book A Question of Guilt by William Scoular. As of 2018 the movie was released online on Encore+.

== See also ==
- Eaton family
- Britton Bath Osler
- Edmund Boyd Osler (Ontario politician)
- William Osler
