= Royal Ottawa Mental Health Centre =

Coordinates: 45.38856°N 75.72966°W

- Royal Ottawa Health Care Group
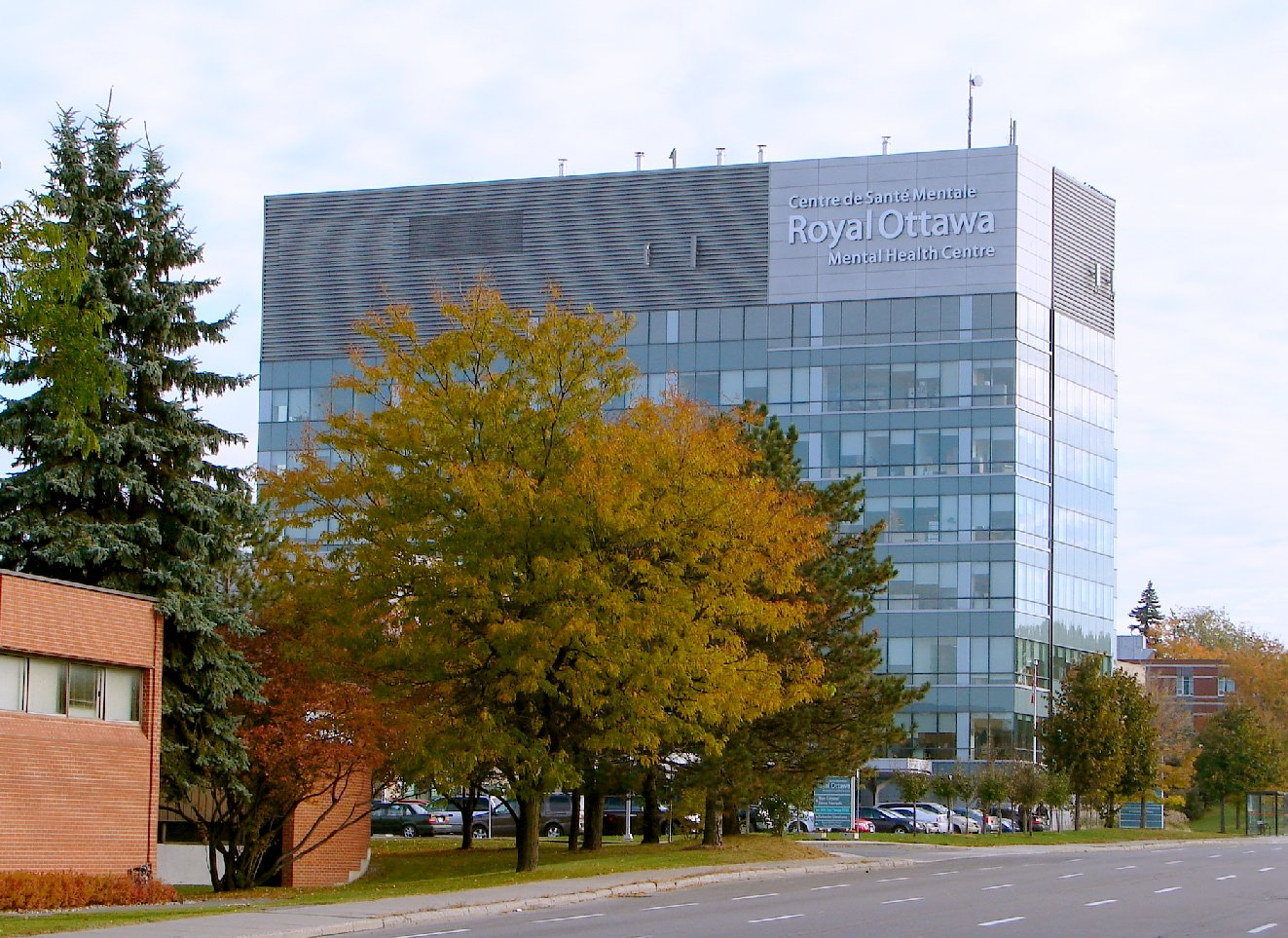

- Location in Ontario

Geography
- Location: Ottawa, Ontario, Canada

Organization
- Care system: Public Medicare (Canada) (OHIP)
- Type: Teaching
- Affiliated university: University of Ottawa

Services
- Beds: 207
- Speciality: Psychiatric facility

History
- Founded: 1961

Links
- Website: www.theroyal.ca
- Lists: Hospitals in Canada

The Royal Ottawa Mental Health Centre, also known as ROMHC or The Royal (formerly the Royal Ottawa Hospital), is a 284-bed, 400,000 square-foot psychiatric hospital located in Ottawa, Ontario, Canada. It is a major branch of the Royal Ottawa Health Care Group (ROHCG), which also encompasses the Brockville Mental Health Centre, the University of Ottawa Institute of Mental Health Research and the Royal Ottawa Foundation for Mental Health.

== History ==
The hospital was established as the Lady Grey Hospital in February 1910 and known in the early days as “the San.” Over the first 60 years, the hospital admitted 11,000 tuberculosis patients from all over Eastern Ontario. The last tuberculosis ward in the facility closed in 1970. It was renamed the Royal Ottawa Hospital at around that time. Andrew Leyshon-Hughes, a killer who stabbed Canadian heiress Nancy Eaton twenty-one times, was confined to the hospital in the 1980s.

The aging hospital was completely replaced by a new facility designed by Parkin Architects and built in the form of an eight-storey tower by a joint venture of Carillion and EllisDon at a cost of $143 million. The new hospital was the first P3 hospital procured in Canada and was officially opened by Premier Dalton McGuinty in October 2006.

== Pedophilia controversy ==
Psychiatrist Paul Fedoroff and the ROMHC have come under criticism for claims they could cure pedophilia, despite the medical consensus of the opposite. In 2014, Fedoroff claimed his program can treat pedophilia and other disorders "so successfully that people who were aroused by children, exhibitionism or rape can eventually lead healthy, consensual sex lives." This contrasted with other experts who said, "There is absolutely, positively no evidence that we can cure 'a paraphilic disorder'".

Fedoroff based his claim on his study of 43 men showed pedophilia on a phallometric test (where the men's erection responses were measured). When these men were tested again, 21 of them showed less response to children and more response to adults. The study was strongly criticized, with experts noting that Fedoroff's measurement technique was unreliable and could be manipulated by the test-takers trying to look normal, and that the finding was actually a statistical illusion caused by a phenomenon called regression to the mean. According to sex researcher J. Michael Bailey, "I think his data were not appreciably different than random coin tossing...Extraordinary claims require extraordinary evidence, and yet Paul's paper is extraordinarily weak."

In 2016, Andreas Mokros and Elmar Habermeyer, sex researchers at the University Hospital of Zurich used Fedoroff's original data and applied statistical modelling of Fedoroff's method to test its validity. Their results verified the previous criticisms, showing directly that Fedoroff's method was invalid and that his reported finding was actually a statistical artefact, indistinguishable from random variation. Fedoroff dismissed the analyses and criticisms, however, saying they "are concerns to be raised about any un-replicated study" and asking "Why all the fuss about this one, especially since the news appears to be good?"

In 2017, Fedoroff and the ROMHC continued their claims of success (called a "boast" by the National Post). According to Fedoroff, "We have evidence all day from people who say they’ve gotten better.....People always come back saying ‘This is much better, I enjoy this so much more than what I used to go through". According to Professor Martin Lalumiere of the University of Ottawa, standard treatment focuses on strategies to avoid trouble (such as avoiding situations where the person is alone with children). In the method Fedoroff describes, pedophiles are taught to find sexual stimulation from people their own age, in repeated sessions using adult pornography as practice. According to James Cantor, a sex researcher known for his MRI studies of pedophilia, what ROHMC clinic is doing is equivalent to the failed “conversion therapy” of homosexuality. Fedoroff's response to the National Post was that there is no evidence that pedophilia cannot be altered and that he and his team are "working on" studies to prove their claims.
