= Eaton family (Toronto) =

Canadian family and department store owners

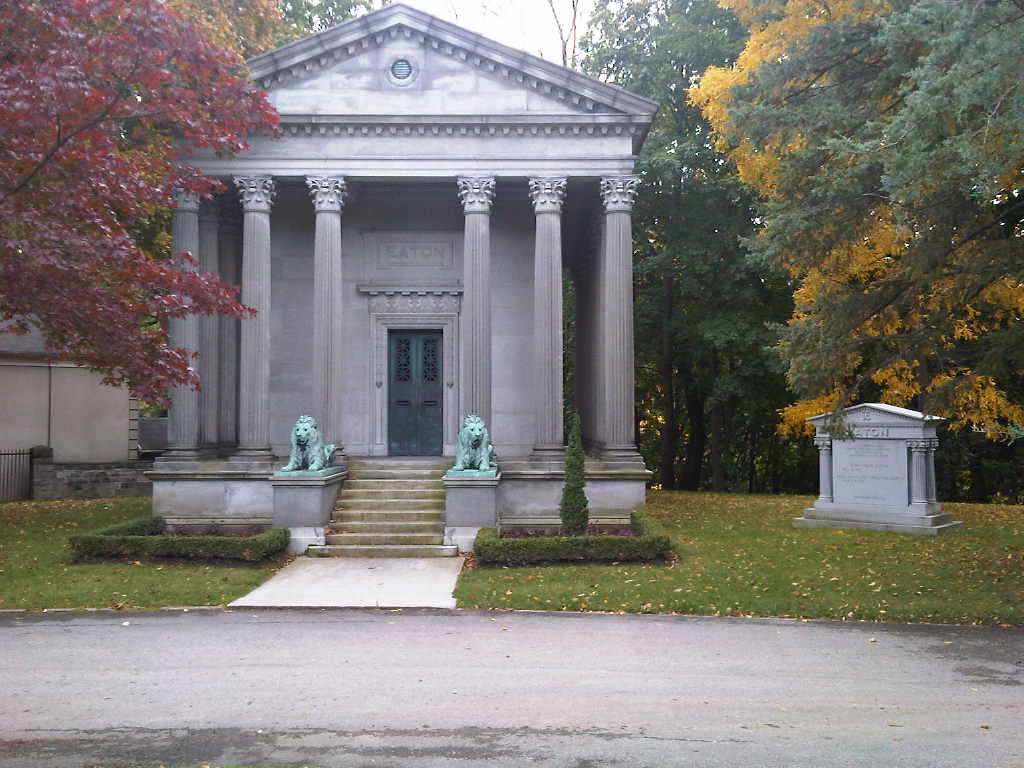
The Eaton family's mausoleum at Mount Pleasant Cemetery in Toronto, with lions by sculptor Eli Harvey

The Eaton family is a Canadian family of Scottish-Irish Methodist origin. Established in Toronto, the family dynasty began in 1869 when Timothy Eaton (1834–1907) founded Eaton's, which became a national chain of department stores. At its height, the family's net worth was around $2 billion. Although the Eaton's department store chain went bankrupt in 1999, the family still holds considerable wealth.

The Canadian Broadcasting Corporation and author Rod McQueen have dubbed them as "Canada's royal family", with the CBC describing the Eatons as "homegrown aristocracy", which drew comparisons to the influential Kennedy family. The Eatons were well known for their lavish lifestyle and occasional philanthropy.

== Notable family members ==
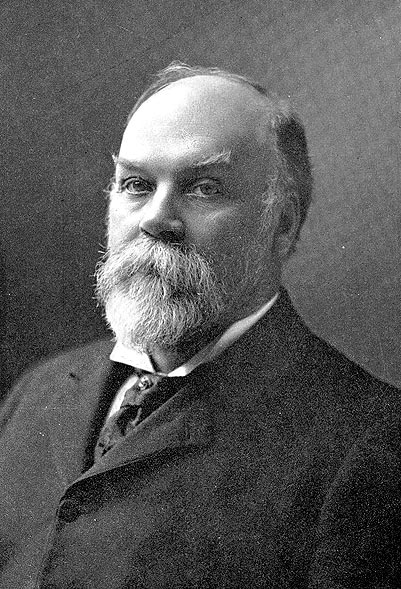
Timothy Eaton in 1903

- John Eaton (1784–1834), m. Margaret Craig (1796–1848)
  - Robert Eaton (1816–1893)
  - Eliza Jane Eaton (1819–1861)
  - Mary Anne Eaton (1821–1841)
  - Margaret Eaton (1824–1900)
  - John Eaton (1827–1895), m. Margaret Herbison (1833–1907)
    - William Herbison Eaton (1873–)
    - (3) Robert Young Eaton (1875–1956), m. Hazel Ireland (1889–1965)
      - Margaret Craig Eaton (1912–1988), m. John Hubert Dunn (1897–)
      - John Wallace Eaton (1912–1990) (twin brother of Margaret), m. Phyllis Finlayson (1915–1997)
      - Edith Elisabeth Nora Eaton (1913–2010), m. Paul Robert van der Stricht (1908–2004)
      - Erskine Robert Eaton (1915–1942) (died in Dieppe Raid)
      - Alan Young Eaton (1916–2000), m. Diana Fishleigh
  - Nancy Eaton (1829–)
  - Sarah Eaton (1831–)
  - James Eaton (1832–1904)
  - (1) Timothy Eaton (1834–1907), m. Margaret Wilson Beattie (1841–1933)
    - Josephine Smyth Eaton (1865–1943), m. Thomas David Meldrum Burnside (1835–1900)
      - Iris Margaret Burnside (1894–1915) (died on the RMS Lusitania)
      - Allan Eaton Meldrum Burnside (1898–1937)
    - Margaret Elizabeth Beattie Eaton (1867–1952), m. Charles Eldridge Burden (1863)
      - Margaret Beattie Eaton Burden (1898–), m. Billy Bishop (1894–1956)
      - Henry John Burden (1894–1960)
    - Edward Young Eaton (1871–1900), m. Tillie Robinson (1869–1895)
      - Marjorie Tillie Eaton (1892–1952), m. Harold Simcoe Coulson (1884–1936)
      - Alice Eaton (1894–), m. Edward Browse
        - Edward Eaton, m. Nancy Leigh Gossage (1926–2007)
          - Nancy Alice Edward Eaton (1961–1985) (murdered)
    - William Fletcher Eaton (1875–1935), m. Gertrude Nora Cook (1877–)
      - Josephine Norah Eaton (1900–), m. George Edward Leishman (1897–)
      - Noel Beattie Eaton (1910–1996), m. Julia Isabell Fleming (1912–1989)
    - (2) Sir John Craig Eaton (1876–1922), m. Flora McCrea (1879–1970), formally known as Lady Eaton
      - Timothy Craig Eaton (1903–1986)
      - (4) John David Eaton (1909–1973), m. Signy Hildur Stefansson (1913–1992)
        - John Craig Eaton II (1937–), m. Catherine Farr
          - John David Eaton (1961–)
          - Signy Eaton (1962–)
          - Henry Craig Eaton (1963–)
        - (5) Fredrik Stefan Eaton (1938–2021), m. Catherine Martin (1940–2023)
          - Fredrik D'Arcy Eaton
            - Fredrik Gordon Eaton (2007–)
            - William D'Arcy Neil Eaton (2008–)
          - Flora Catherine Eaton Coakley
        - Thor Edgar Eaton (1942–2017), m. Nicole Courtois (1945–)
          - Thor Eaton
          - Cleophée Eaton
        - (6) George Ross Eaton (1945–)
      - Edgar Allison Eaton (1912–1988), m. Mildred Jarvis Page (1915–1968)
      - Gilbert McCrea Eaton (1915–1985), m. Marjorie Ann Maston (1913–1988)
      - Florence Mary Eaton (1919–2012), m. Frank Flavelle McEachren (1918–1995)
      - Evlyn Beatrice Eaton (1919?–1989) (adopted), m. Russell Payton (1915–1976)

Notes

- Not exhaustive – listing is generally restricted to siblings of Timothy Eaton, his children, their spouses, and significant descendants.
- (#) – order of succession as the head of Eaton's.

== Eaton properties and monuments ==
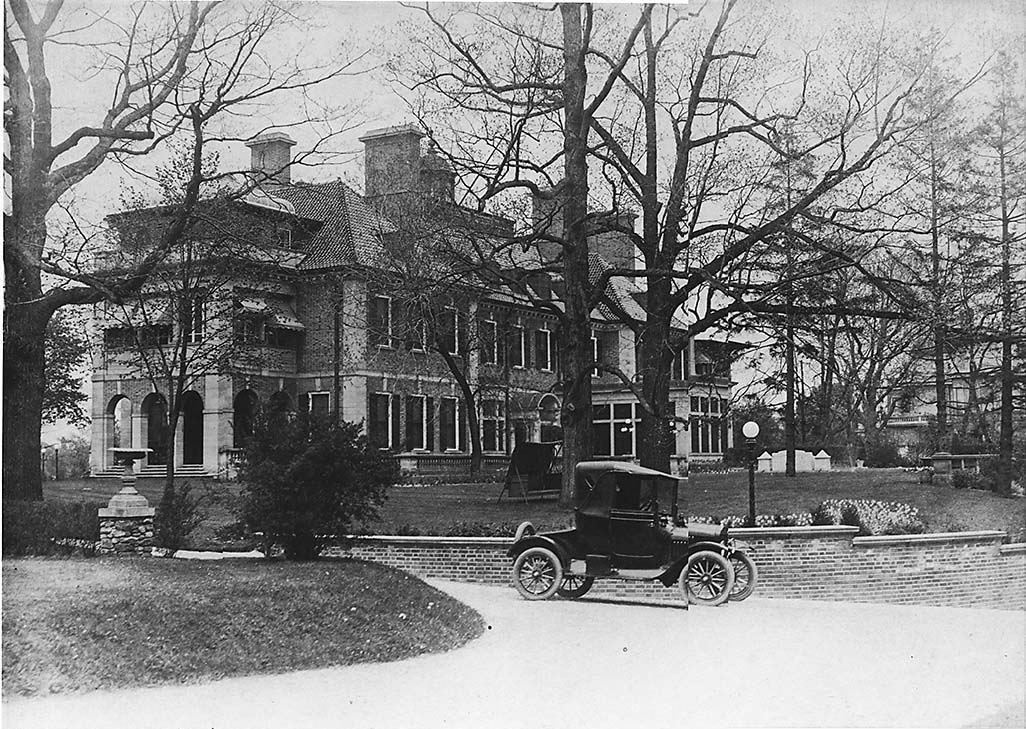
Ardwold, Toronto (1910)

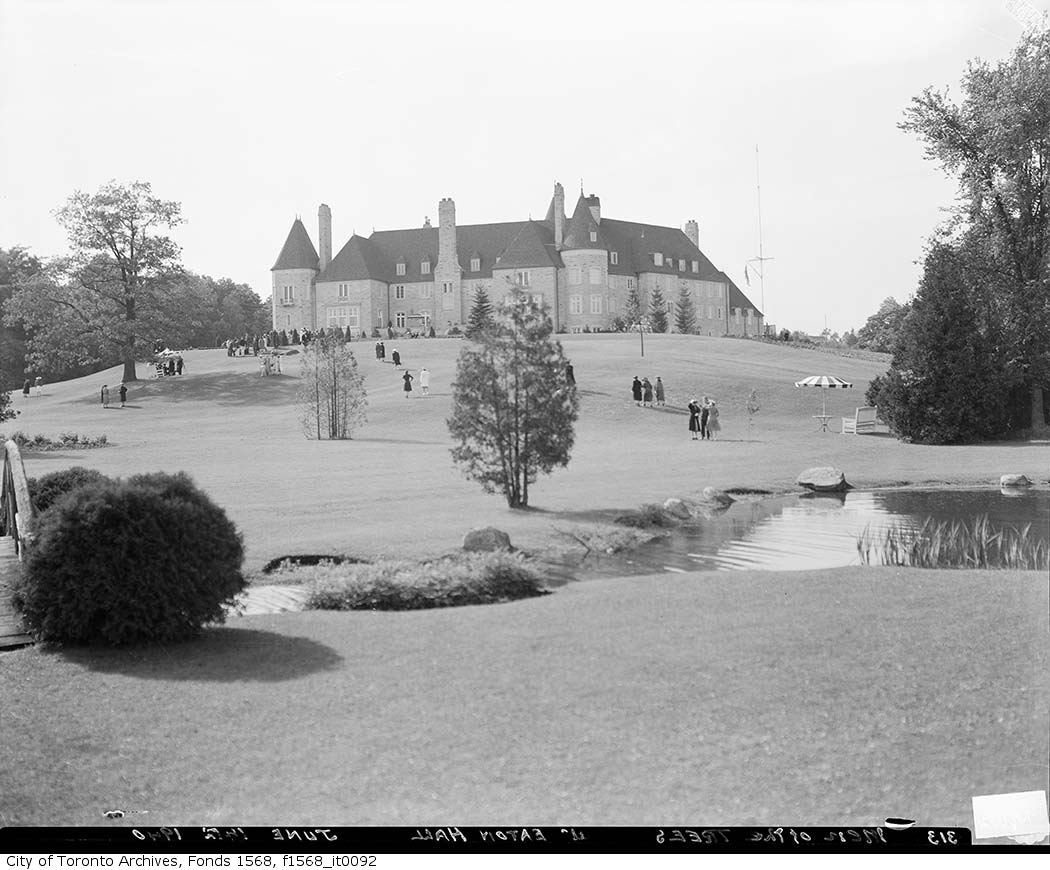
Eaton Hall, King Township (1940)

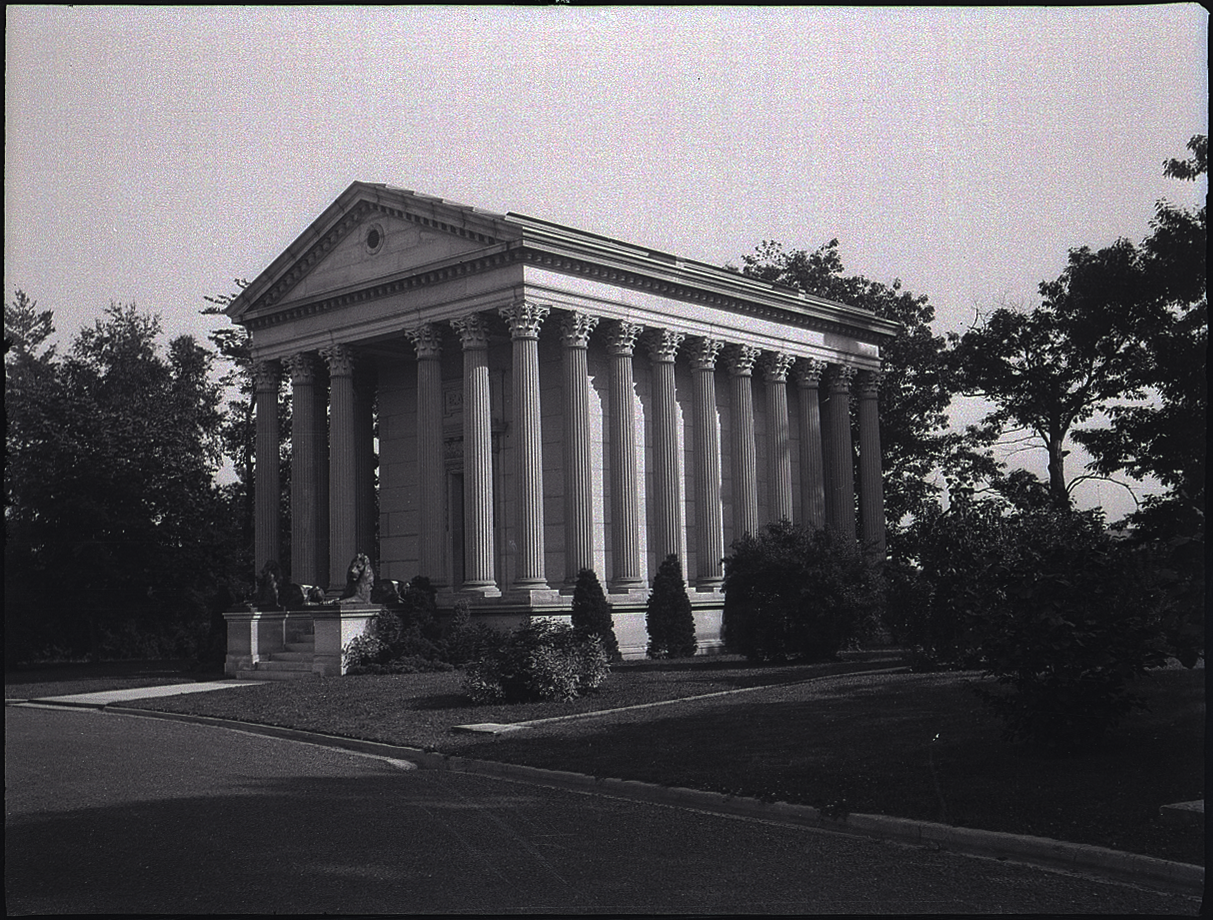
Eaton Mausoleum, Mount Pleasant Cemetery, Toronto (1924)

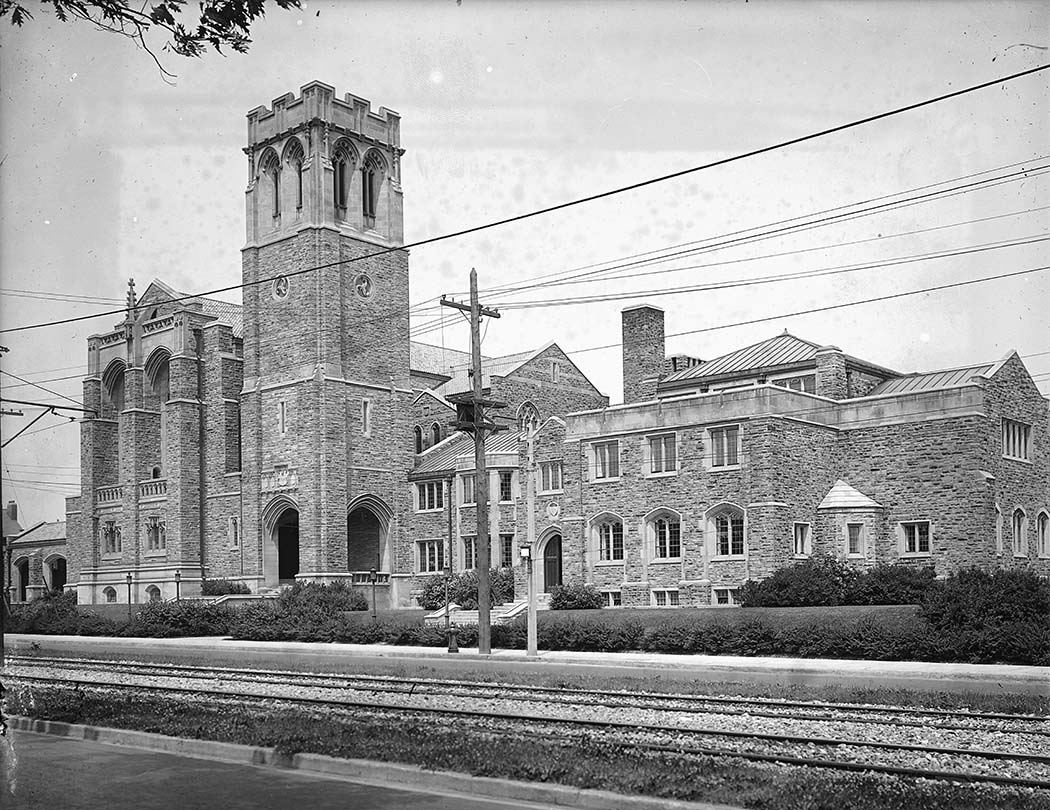
Timothy Eaton Memorial Church, Toronto (1910s)

== See also ==
- Statue of Timothy Eaton
- Telegram Corporation
