= Timothy Eaton Memorial Church =

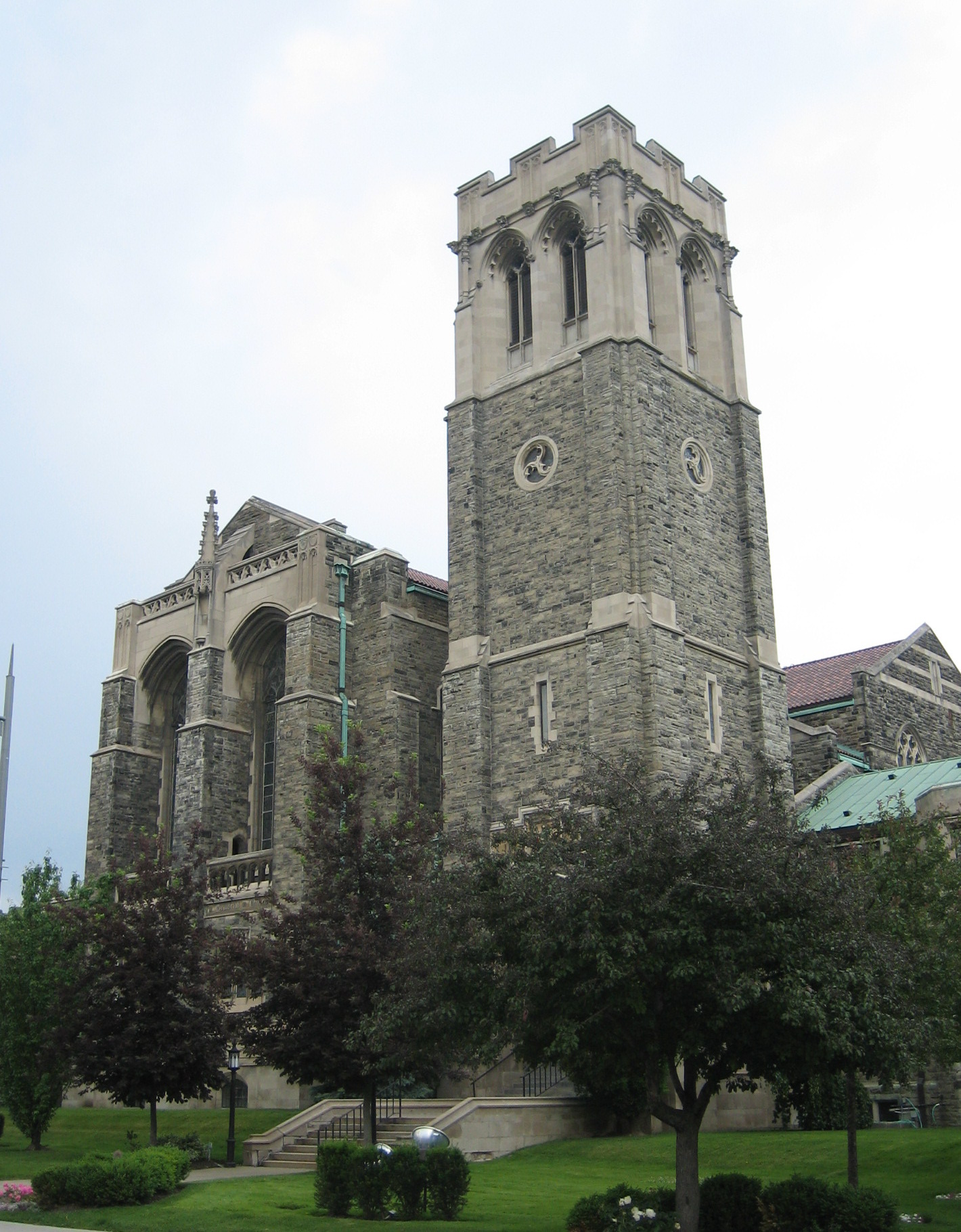
- South side of the church in 2008
- Timothy Eaton Memorial Church
- 43.686207°N 79.405822°W
- Location: 230 St. Clair Avenue West; Toronto, Ontario, Canada
- Denomination: United Church of Canada
- Previous denomination: Methodist Church
- Website: www.temc.ca

Architecture
- Architect: Wickson & Gregg
- Style: Gothic Revival
- Groundbreaking: 1911
- Completed: 1915

Timothy Eaton Memorial Church is a mainstream Protestant church located at 230 St. Clair Avenue West in Forest Hill, Toronto, Ontario. Originally Methodist, since 1925, it has belonged to the United Church of Canada. The church is named in memory of Timothy Eaton, founder of the Eaton's department store chain, whose family donated the land the church sits on. The principal church building, completed in 1915, was designed in the Gothic Revival style by architectural firm Wickson & Gregg.

== Ministry and Staff ==
Senior Minister: Rev. Dr. Jason Byassee.

Pastor: Dayle K. Barrett

Congregational Designated Minister of Pastoral Care: Joanne Leatch

== History ==
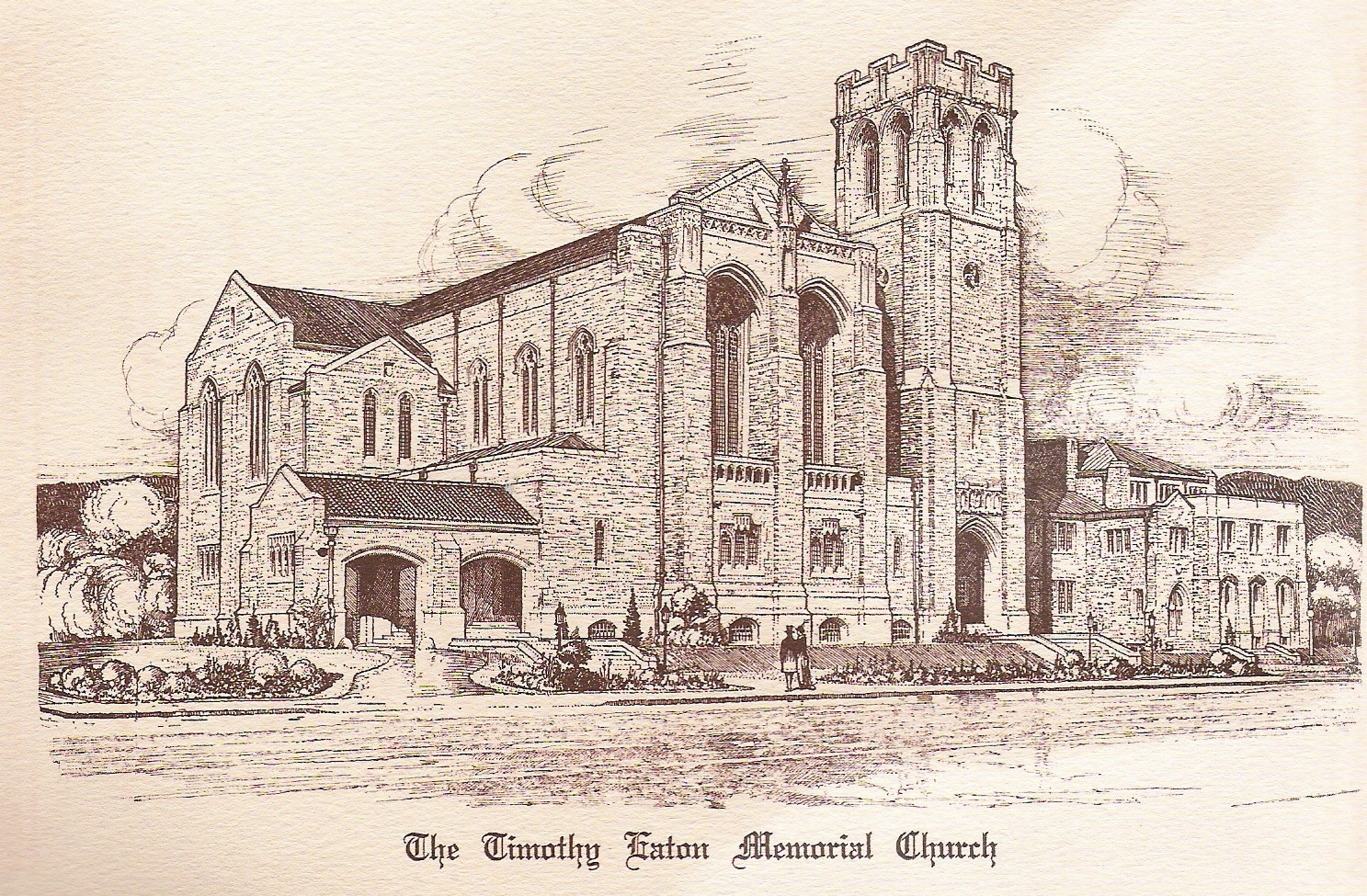
Timothy Eaton Memorial Church, as pictured in the pages of the opening services programme, December 1914

The Methodist Social Union of Toronto approached members of the Eaton family for their support in the creation of a church in the area. As a memorial to her husband, Timothy Eaton, Margaret Wilson Eaton and her son, John Craig Eaton, donated the land for the church and financed the construction of the original structures.

The Sunday School building was completed in 1911 and used for worship services until the sanctuary opened. The design work for the church building was done by the architectural firm of Wickson & Gregg. Construction was completed in 1915.

One of the church's best-known features is a 1915 stained glass reproduction of The Light of the World by English Pre-Raphaelite painter Holman Hunt; it was dedicated in memory of Timothy Eaton. After the death of Sir John Craig Eaton, additional memorial windows were added. The majority of the stained glass in the church was created by the Robert McCausland Company of Toronto. T. J. Crawford was organist at the church from 1933 until 1946.

Famed Air Force ace Billy Bishop was married in the church, and his funeral was held there four decades later. The property has been listed in the City of Toronto Heritage Property Inventory since January 2008.

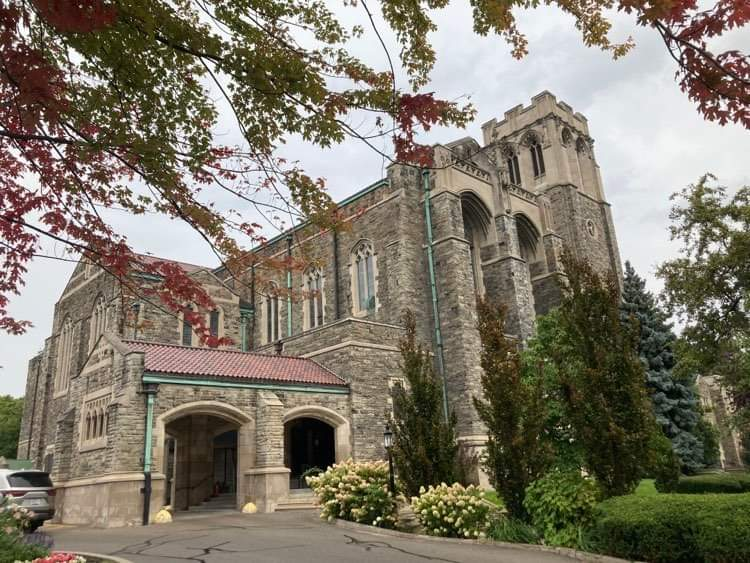
Timothy Eaton Memorial Church

== Broadcasts ==
This congregation has been known for its preaching ministry and music, and it has maintained radio and later internet broadcasts of its services. Sunday morning services were previously broadcast over 1540 CHIN-AM and are now livestreamed on the church's website.

== See also ==
- List of United Church of Canada churches in Toronto
- Eaton family
