= Timothy Eaton =

Northern Irish-Canadian businessman (1834–1907)

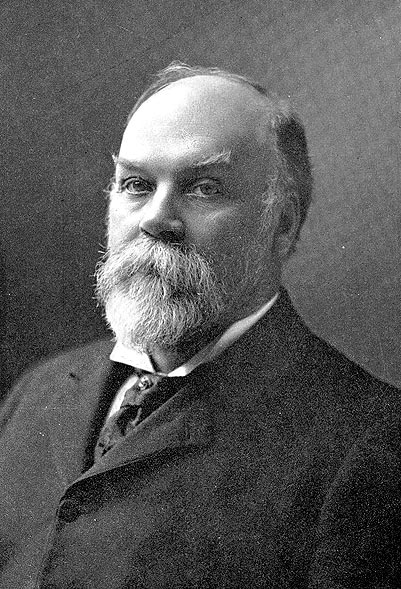
- Born: March 1834; Ballymena, County Antrim, Ireland
- Died: 31 January 1907 (aged 72); Toronto, Ontario, Canada
- Resting place: Mount Pleasant Cemetery, Toronto
- Known for: Founder of Eaton's
- Spouse: Margaret Wilson Beattie
- Children: 8
- Relatives: Eaton family

Timothy Eaton (March 1834 – 31 January 1907) was an Irish-Canadian businessman who founded the Eaton's department store, one of the most important retail businesses in Canada's history.

== Early life and family ==
He was born in Ballymena, County Antrim, Ireland (now Northern Ireland). His parents were Scottish Protestants, John Eaton and Margaret Craig. As a 20-year-old Irish apprentice shopkeeper, Timothy Eaton sailed from Ireland to settle with other family members in southern Ontario, Canada. On 28 May 1862, Eaton married Margaret Wilson Beattie. They had five sons and three daughters. Among the sons were John Craig Eaton and Edward Young Eaton. One of the daughters, Josephine Smyth Eaton, survived the sinking of RMS Lusitania off the Irish coast in 1915. His granddaughter, Iris Burnside, was lost in that sinking.

== T. Eaton Co. Limited ==
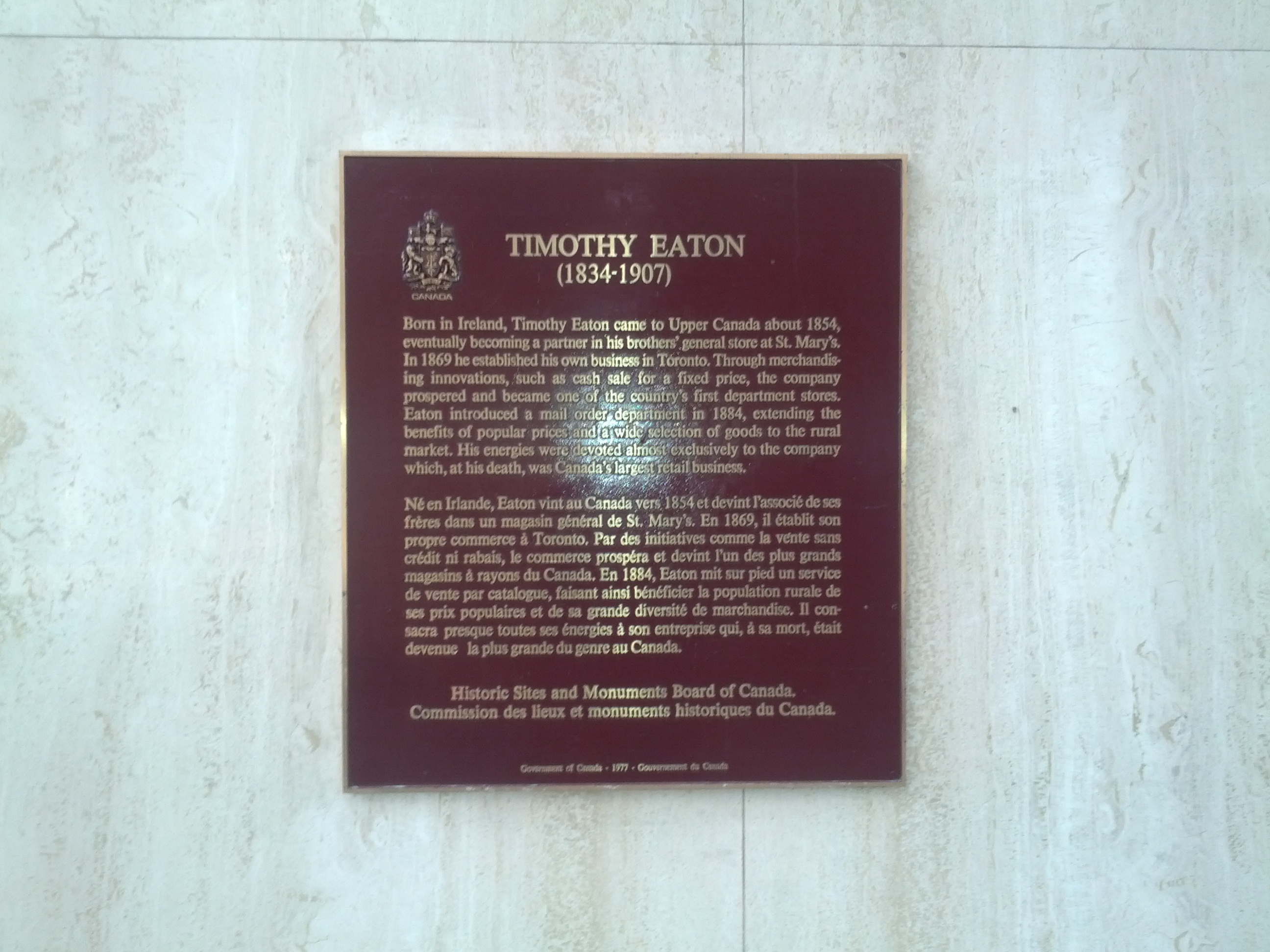
Plaque about Eaton in Toronto

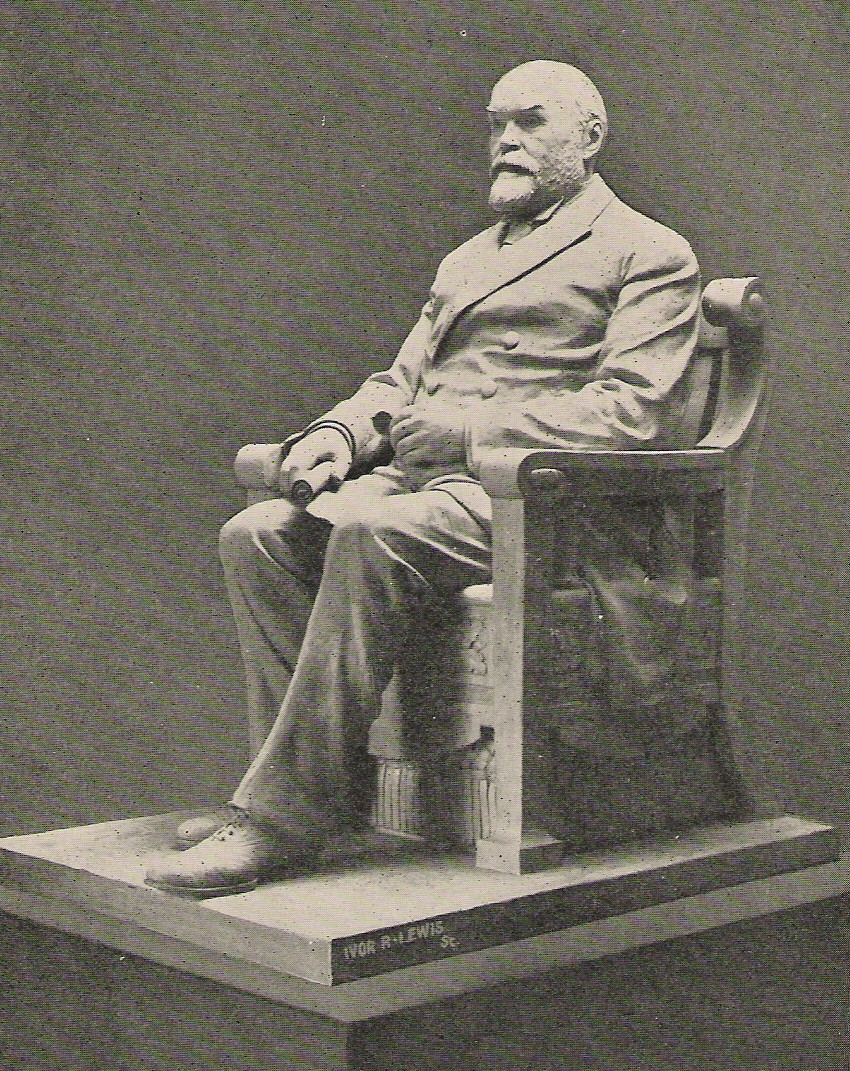
This bronze statue of Eaton (photographed in 1919) sits in the Royal Ontario Museum in Toronto; a second casting sits in Bell MTS Place in Winnipeg

In 1854, he worked for a short time in a haberdashery store in Glen Williams, Ontario. His sister married William Reid; they owned a farm in Georgetown, Ontario, a short distance from Glen Williams. In 1865, with the help of his brothers, Robert and James, Timothy Eaton set up a bakery business in the town of Kirkton, Ontario, which went under after only a few months. Undaunted, he opened a dry goods store in St. Marys, Ontario.

In 1869, Eaton purchased an existing dry-goods and haberdashery business at 178 Yonge Street in Toronto. In promoting his new business, Eaton embraced two retail practices that were ground-breaking at the time: first, all goods had one price (no haggling) with no credit given, and second, all purchases came with a money-back guarantee (a practice expressed in what would become the long-standing store slogan of "Goods Satisfactory or Money Refunded").

Starting in 1884, Eaton introduced Canada to the wonders of the mail-order catalogue, reaching thousands of small towns and rural communities with an array of products previously unattainable. In these tiny communities, the arrival of Eaton's catalogue was a major event. More than clothing, furniture, or the latest in kitchen gadgetry, the catalogue offered such practical items as milking machines, in addition to just about every other contraption or new invention desirable. And, when rendered obsolete by the new season's catalogue, it served another important use in the outdoor privy of most every rural home.

Eaton spawned a colossal retail empire that his offspring would expand coast to coast, reaching its high point during World War II, when the T. Eaton Co. Limited employed more than 70,000 people. Although Eaton did not invent the department store, nor was he the first retailer in the world to implement a money-back guarantee, the chain he founded popularized both concepts and revolutionized retailing in Canada.

== Death and legacy ==
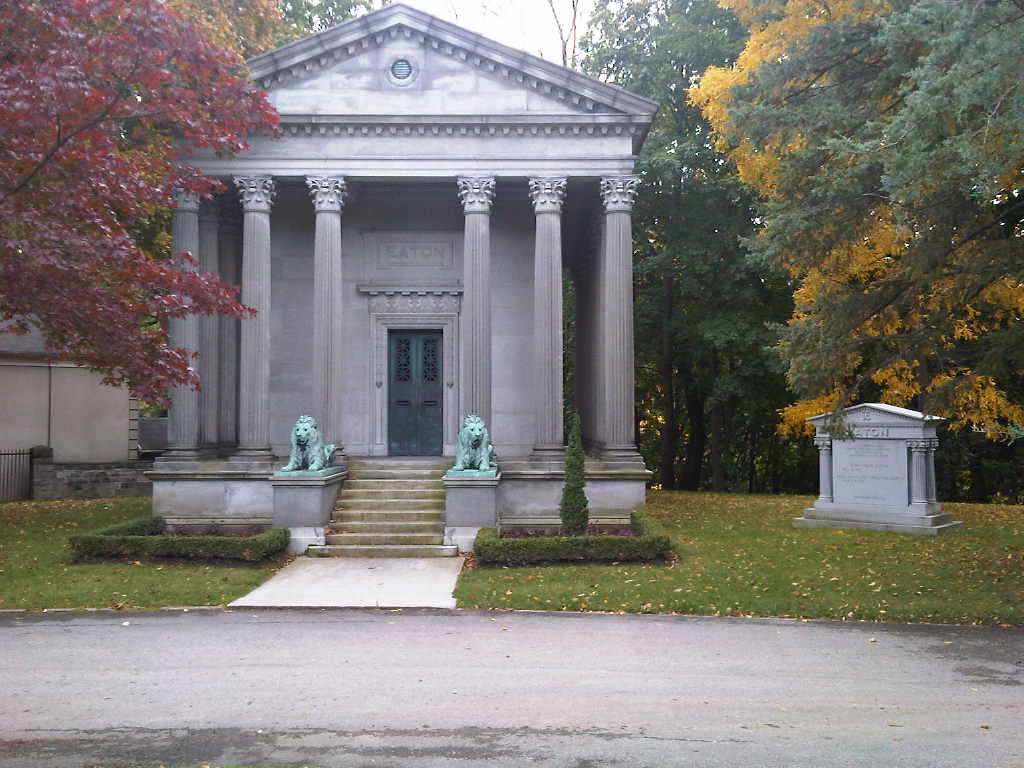
The Eaton family's mausoleum in Mount Pleasant Cemetery, Toronto

Eaton died of pneumonia on 31 January 1907, and is buried in Mount Pleasant Cemetery in Toronto. He was succeeded by his son, John Craig Eaton.

In 1919, two life-sized statues of Timothy Eaton were donated by the Eaton's employees to the Toronto and Winnipeg stores in celebration of the 50th anniversary of the company. For years, it was tradition for customers in both Toronto and Winnipeg to rub the toe of the statue for good luck. The Toronto statue is now housed by the Royal Ontario Museum, and the Winnipeg statue sits in the city's arena, Canada Life Centre (formerly MTS Centre and Bell MTS Place), in almost exactly the same spot where it stood in the now demolished Eaton's store (albeit one storey higher). Museum-goers in Toronto and hockey fans in Winnipeg continue to rub Timothy Eaton's toe for luck.

His grandson was flying ace Henry John Burden. In 1985, his great-great-granddaughter, Nancy Eaton, was murdered by a childhood friend, who was found not guilty by reason of insanity.

Timothy Eaton Memorial Church, in Toronto, was erected in 1914.

The town of Eatonia, Saskatchewan was named after Timothy Eaton.

The ground of Ballymena RFC, originally the sports grounds of the Mid-Antrim Sports Association, is called Eaton Park.

A school in the Scarborough district of Toronto, Timothy Eaton Business and Technical Institute, was named after him. It opened in 1971 for classes and closed its doors permanently in 2009.

== In popular culture ==
Brian Rhodes portrays Eaton in "Invention Convention" (July 31, 2012), episode 9 of season 5 of the Canadian television period drama Murdoch Mysteries.

== See also ==
- Robert Simpson (merchant)
- John Wanamaker
