= John Craig Eaton =

Canadian businessman

Sir John Craig Eaton
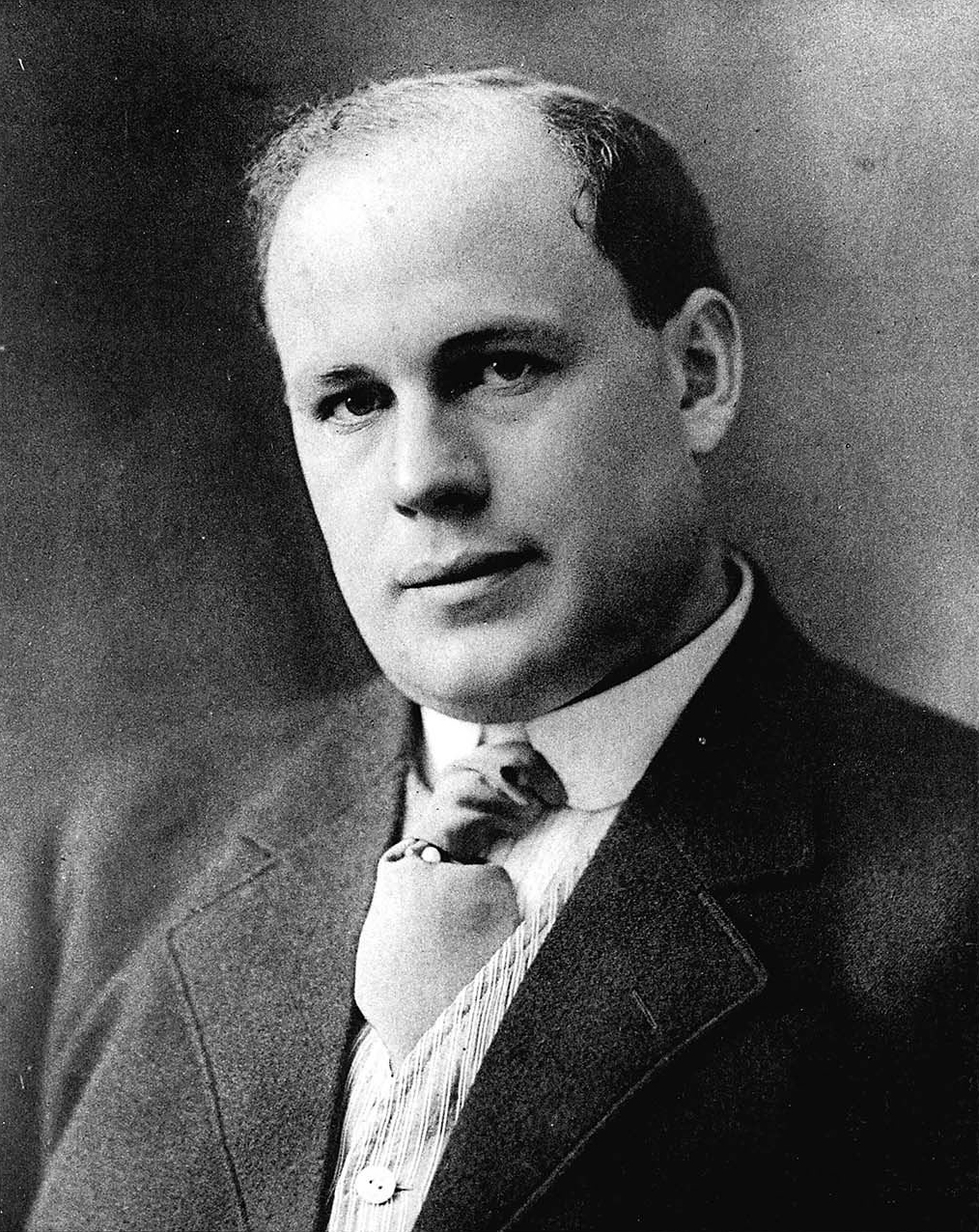
- Portrait around 1911
- Born: April 28, 1876; Toronto, Ontario, Canada
- Died: March 30, 1922 (aged 45); Toronto, Ontario, Canada
- Resting place: Eaton Mausoleum, Mount Pleasant Cemetery, Toronto
- Spouse: Flora McCrea (m. 1901; died 1970)
- Children: 6, including John David Eaton
- Parent(s): Timothy Eaton; Margaret Wilson Beattie
- Relatives: Eaton family

Sir John Craig Eaton (April 28, 1876 – March 30, 1922) was a Canadian businessman and a member of the Eaton family.

== Life and career ==
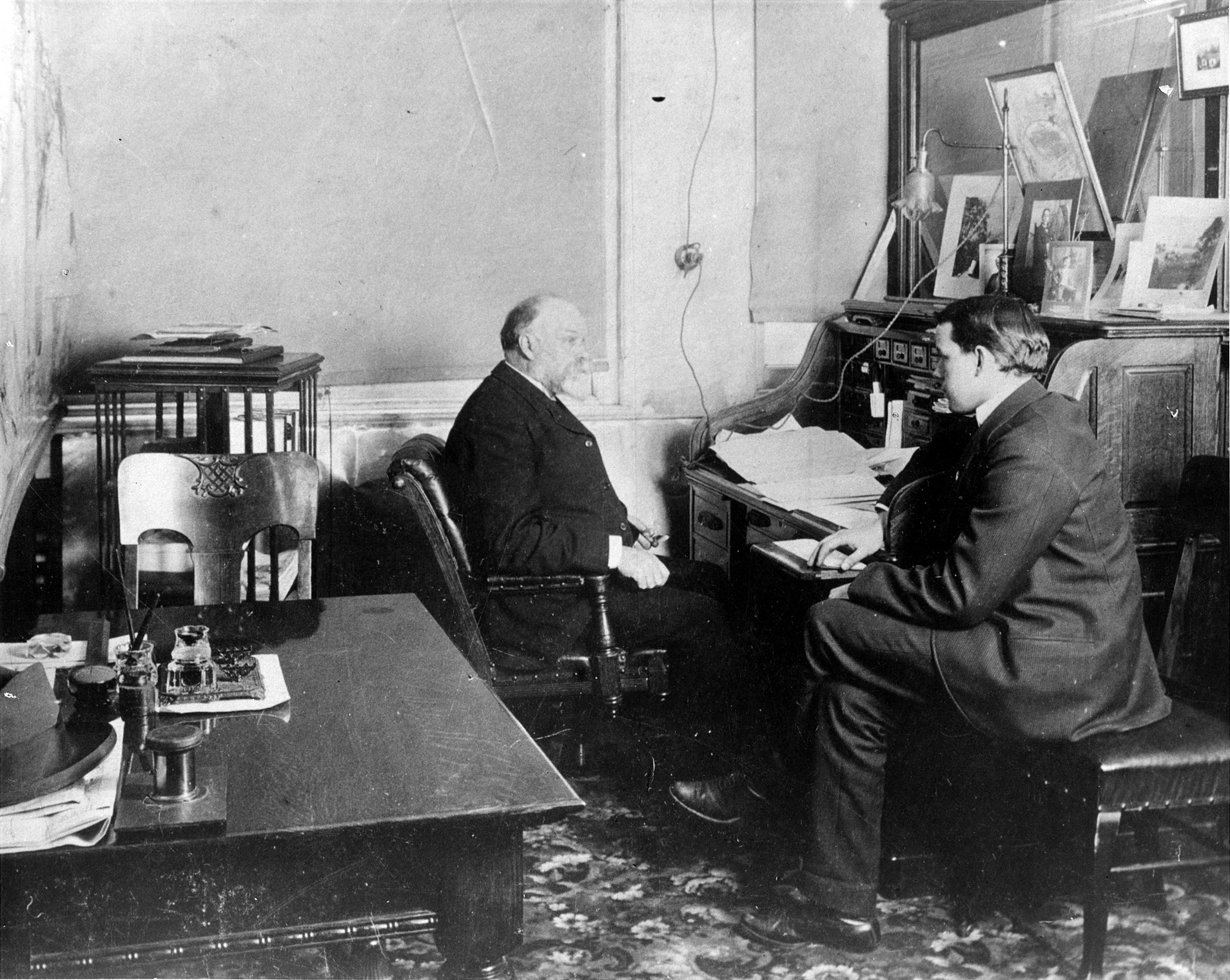
With his father in 1899

He was born in Toronto, Ontario, the youngest son of department store magnate Timothy Eaton and his wife, Margaret Wilson Beattie. He married Flora McCrea in 1901, and they had six children: Timothy Craig, John David, Edgar Allison, Gilbert McCrea, Florence Mary, and Evlyn (adopted).

In 1905, weeks after laying the final stone at the new store at the corner of Portage and Donald in Winnipeg, John Craig (aka 'Jack') participated in several automobile races, successfully lowering the 5-mile record driving a Packard. He didn't appear to race again after 1905, but his grandson, George Eaton inherited not only the family business, but also the racing gene.

Upon the death of his father in 1907, he inherited five million dollars and the T. Eaton Company. He became its president at this time, and the company flourished under his control. He greatly influenced the company and expanded the stores nationally.

He built Ardwold, an enormous residence of 50 rooms in Toronto, beginning in 1909 and finishing in 1911. He also acquired a resort home from his mother in Oakville, Ontario, called the Raymar Estate (the estate has since disappeared).

In 1915, Eaton was made a Knight Bachelor in recognition of his participation in the war effort. He thus became Sir John Craig Eaton, and his wife was known as Lady Eaton.

He was a noted philanthropist. Perhaps his most lavish public contribution was the gift, made together with his mother, of land and funds for a large Methodist church on St Clair Avenue in Toronto. Named Timothy Eaton Memorial Church after his father, it was constructed in 1912–14. He also made many donations to Omemee, Ontario, the home town of his wife Flora. These donations included Coronation Hall (1911), and the manse and organ for Trinity United Church. The Eatons' donation of $500,000 established the first endowed chair at the University of Toronto and first full-time professorship of medicine in the British Empire, the Sir John and Lady Eaton Professor and Chair of Medicine, in 1919.

He died of pneumonia following influenza in 1922 at the age of 45, and his cousin Robert Young Eaton became president of the company until Sir John's son, John David Eaton, reached an appropriate age to take over. Sir John's grandson, John Craig Eaton II, served as chairman of Eaton's in its later years.

== In popular culture ==
In "Murdoch in Ladies Wear" (March 4, 2013), episode 8 of season 6 of the Canadian television period detective series Murdoch Mysteries, Eaton is played by Michael Therriault.

== See also ==
- Eatonia, Saskatchewan (named in his honour)
