= Jean-François du Soleil =

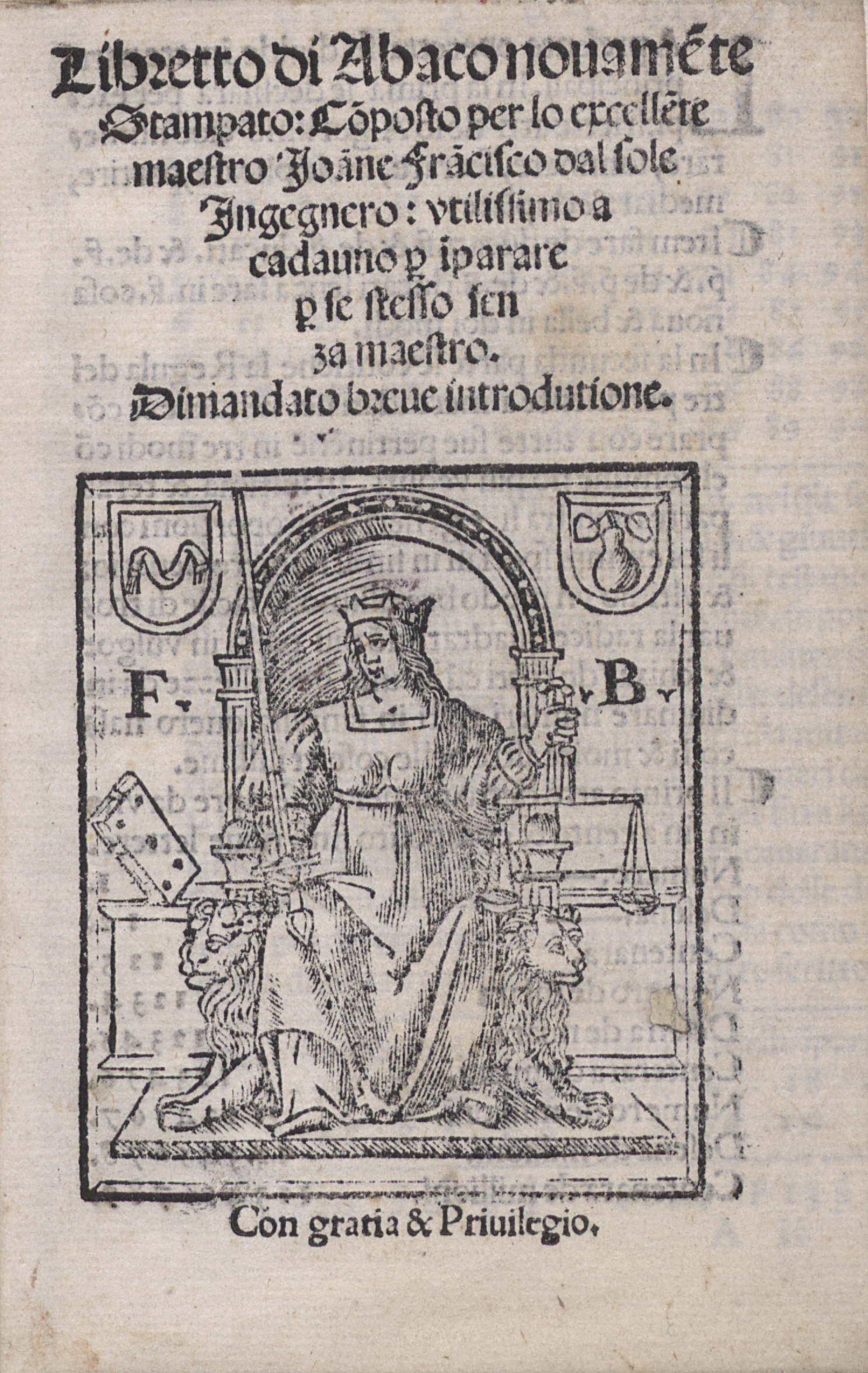
Libretto di abaco, title page (1526)

Jean-François du Soleil, also known with the Italian name of Francesco dal Sole (1490 – 1565), was a French mathematician, astronomer and engineer. He was also a grammatician, orator and poet.

== Life ==
Native of Chateau-Thierry about 1490, soon he moved to Italy. He was active in Venice and Ferrara. He died about 1565.

Among his works the Libretto di abaco, published in Venice in 1526, is considered a basic text from the school of Borgi and Pacioli.

== Works ==
- Libretto di abaco (in Italian). Venice: Francesco Bindoni & Maffeo Pasini. 1526.
