= Jules Coignet =

French painter

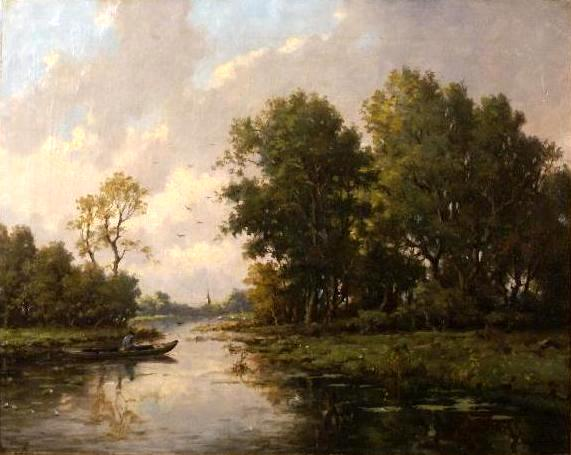
A Barbizon landscape (1830)

Jules Louis Philippe Coignet was born in Paris in 1798 and died there in 1860. He was a noted landscape painter who had studied under Jean-Victor Bertin. He travelled a good deal in his own country as well as elsewhere in Europe and the East, and produced a considerable number of views. A regular exhibitor at the Paris Salon exhibitions, he was awarded a gold medal there in the Salon of 1824 and was given state recognition by being made a Chevalier of the Legion of Honour in 1836.

== Paintings ==
As a painter, Coignet holds a middle place between the Idealists and the Realists, and his work is remarkable for the combination of vigour and delicacy in the effects of light and shade, for poetical feeling, for a firm brush, and occasionally for grandeur of conception. This is particularly evident in "The Ruins of the Temple of Paestum", now in Munich's Neue Pinakothek. There are times too when his paintings have an atmospheric, almost Impressionist effect. One example is the coastal sunset in the Louvre; another is the pastel "Grey weather over the sea" (1848) in the Dijon museum.

Following the 1824 exhibition in Paris of John Constable's paintings, Coignet began painting outside in the forest of Fontainebleau and encouraged his students to do the same. One of his specialities was painting tree 'portraits', of which there are many examples, both as finished paintings and as sketches in oil paint. Two notable examples are the ancient oak, with a dolmen and meditating monk in the background, in the Quimper museum and the dramatic "Oak tree and reeds" in the Musée Jean de La Fontaine at Château-Thierry. As a pioneer of open air painting (la peinture en plein air), Coignet has been counted a member of the Barbizon school, the artists associated with the village of Barbizon, where he had painted long before they settled there. In fact one of the minor members of this school, the genre painter Ferdinand Chaigneau, was a pupil of Coignet's. Among his other pupils were Léo Drouyn, the Belgian landscapist Auguste Böhm and the orientalist Charles-Théodore Frère.

In addition to producing many water-colours, pastels and etchings, he wrote a book on landscape painting and published in 1825 a series of sixty Italian views.

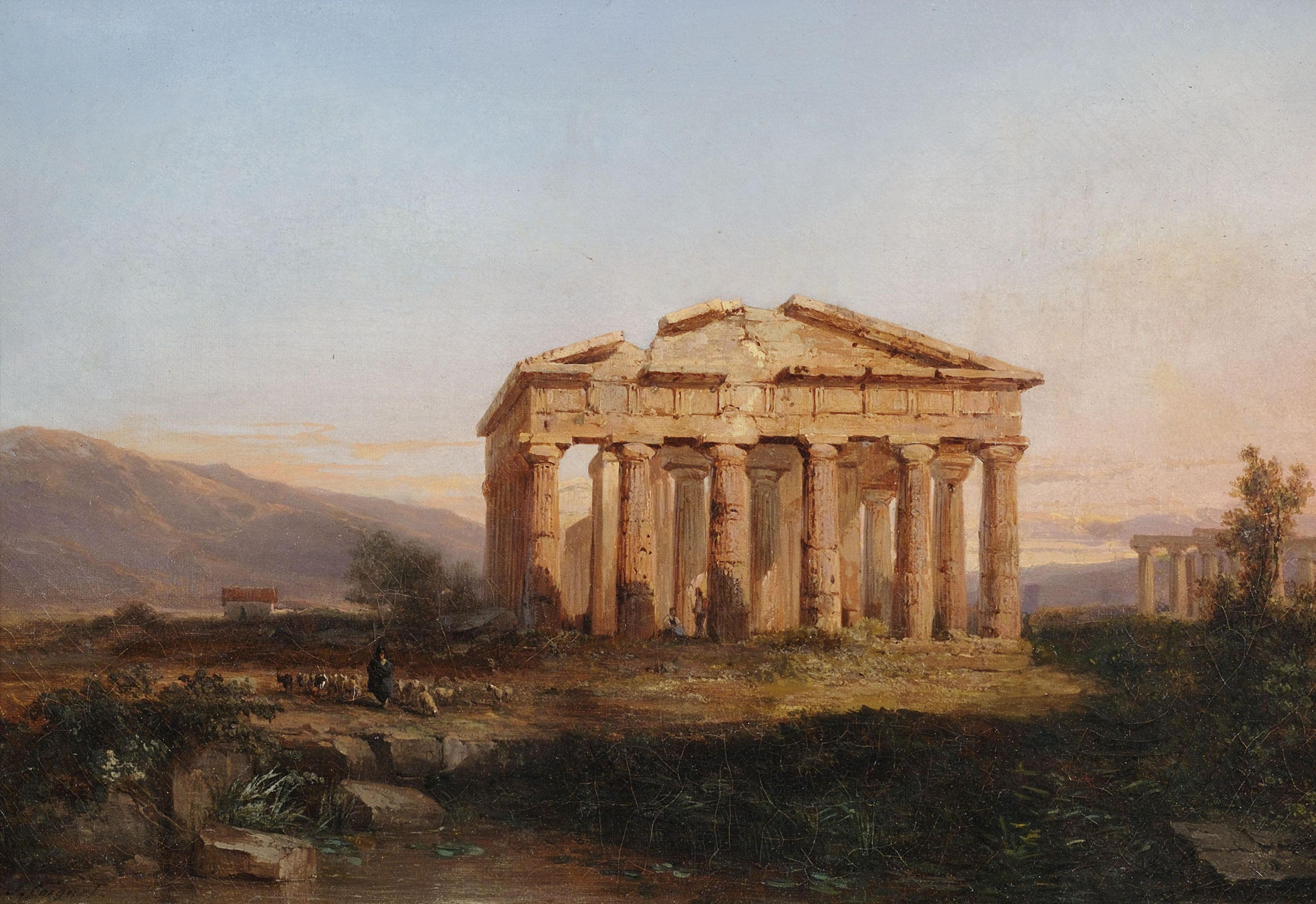
The temples at Paestum in evening light

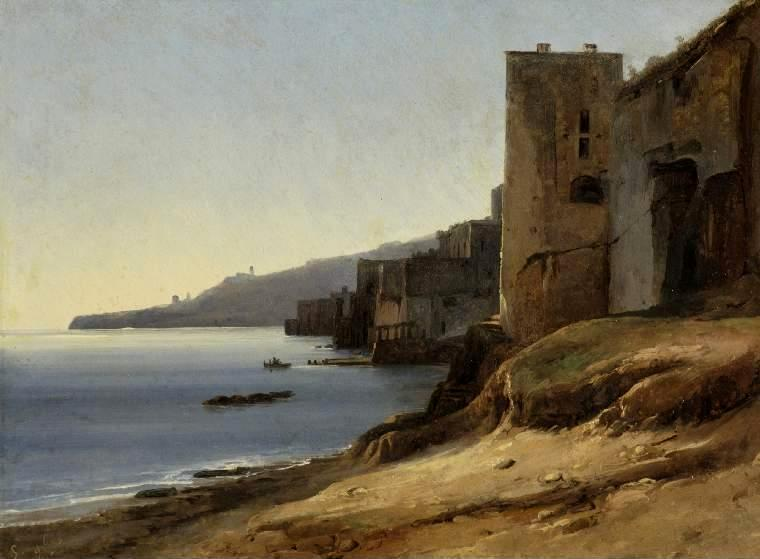
The coast of the Bay of Naples near Posilippo, 1823/8, Fitzwilliam Museum

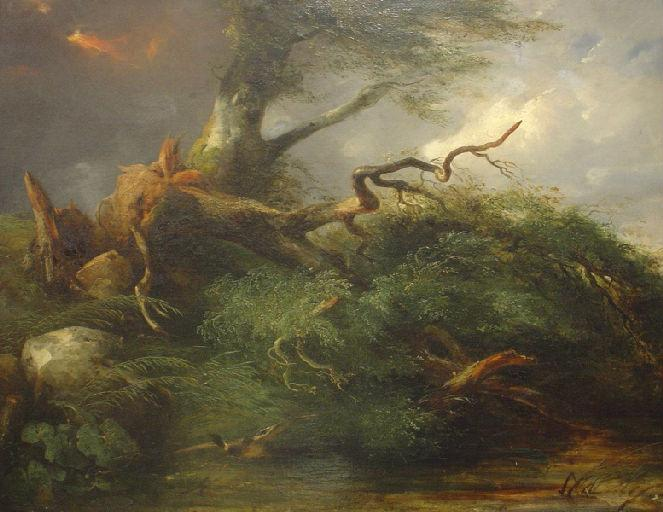
An oak felled in a storm, illustrating La Fontaine's fable of "The Oak and the Reed", 1831, Château-Thierry museum

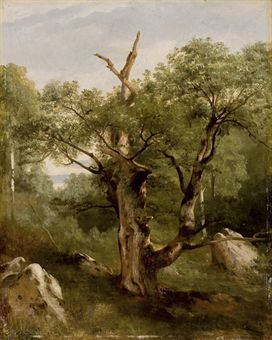
A study of a decaying tree

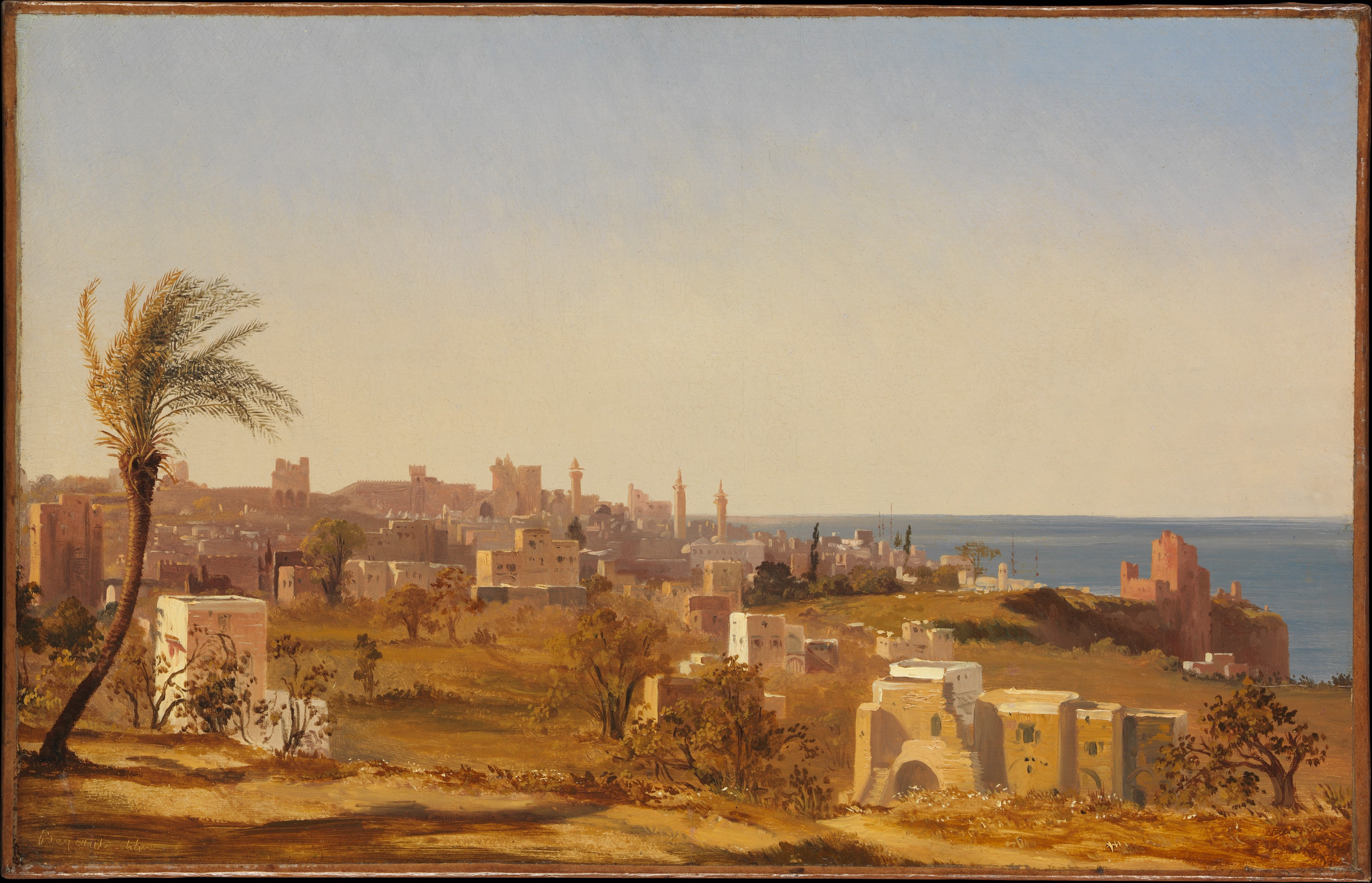
View of Beirut
