= Aisne-Marne American Cemetery and Memorial =

ABMC World War I cemetery in Picardie, France

- American Battle Monuments Commission
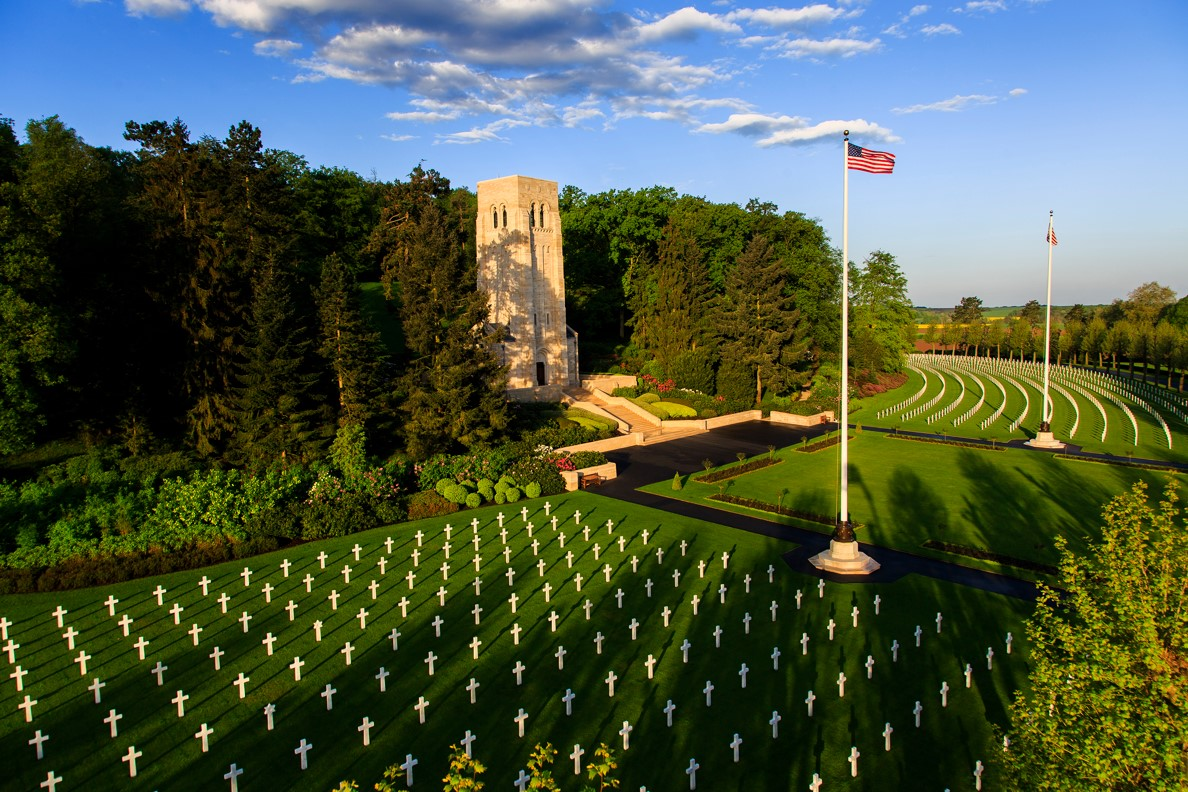
- Tombstones and the memorial chapel
- Used for those deceased 1918
- Established: 1918
- Location: 49°04′46″N 03°17′29″E near Château-Thierry, France
- Designed by: Cram & Ferguson of Boston, Ma. (Monument) •Alfred Bottiau, Paris, France (Figures)
- Total burials: 2,289 plus 1,060 commemorated
- Unknowns: 250

Burials by nation
- United States

Burials by war
- World War I

UNESCO World Heritage Site
- Official name: Funerary and memory sites of the First World War (Western Front)
- Type: Cultural
- Criteria: i, ii, vi
- Designated: 2023 (45th session)
- Reference no.: 1567-AI01

The Aisne-Marne American Cemetery and Memorial is a 42-acre (17 ha) World War I cemetery in Belleau, Northern France. It is located at the foot of the hill where the Battle of Belleau Wood was fought, with many American fatalities. The cemetery also contains burials from the Battle of Château-Thierry, later that summer.

The site is maintained by the American Battle Monuments Commission, and its dedication ceremony was held on Memorial Day, May 30, 1937. Among those buried there are Medal of Honor recipient Weedon Osborne.

The grounds include both the Château-Thierry American Monument and a monument to US Marines.

== Cemetery ==
The cemetery itself is laid out in the form of the capital letter T, with the Memorial Chapel crowning the T-shape on a small hill to south, the cross-bars making up the two burial plots and the pathway leading into the cemetery making up the stem of the letter-shape.

Each of the two burial plots (Plot A and Plot B) contain 13 rows of headstones, which consist of either Stars of David or Latin crosses. There are 2,289 burials in the cemetery, 250 of which contain unknown remains.

== Memorial Chapel ==
The Memorial Chapel is built over the site of front-line battle trenches dug in defense of Belleau Wood. When entering the Memorial Chapel, one can see on the wall to the right a small hole that was made by a passing German anti-tank gun. Looking above the inside entrance door, one will see the following inscription:

THE NAMES RECORDED ON THESE WALLS ARE THOSE OF AMERICAN SOLDIERS WHO FOUGHT IN THIS REGION AND WHO SLEEP IN UNKNOWN GRAVES.

The names of 1,060 soldiers missing in action are inscribed on the Chapel's walls.

== Notable burials ==
- US Navy Lt. (j.g.) Weedon E. Osborne (1892–1918 †), recipient of the Medal of Honor
- Major Allen Melancthon Sumner (1882-1918 †) USMC officer awarded the Croix de Guerre and Silver Star

== Gallery ==
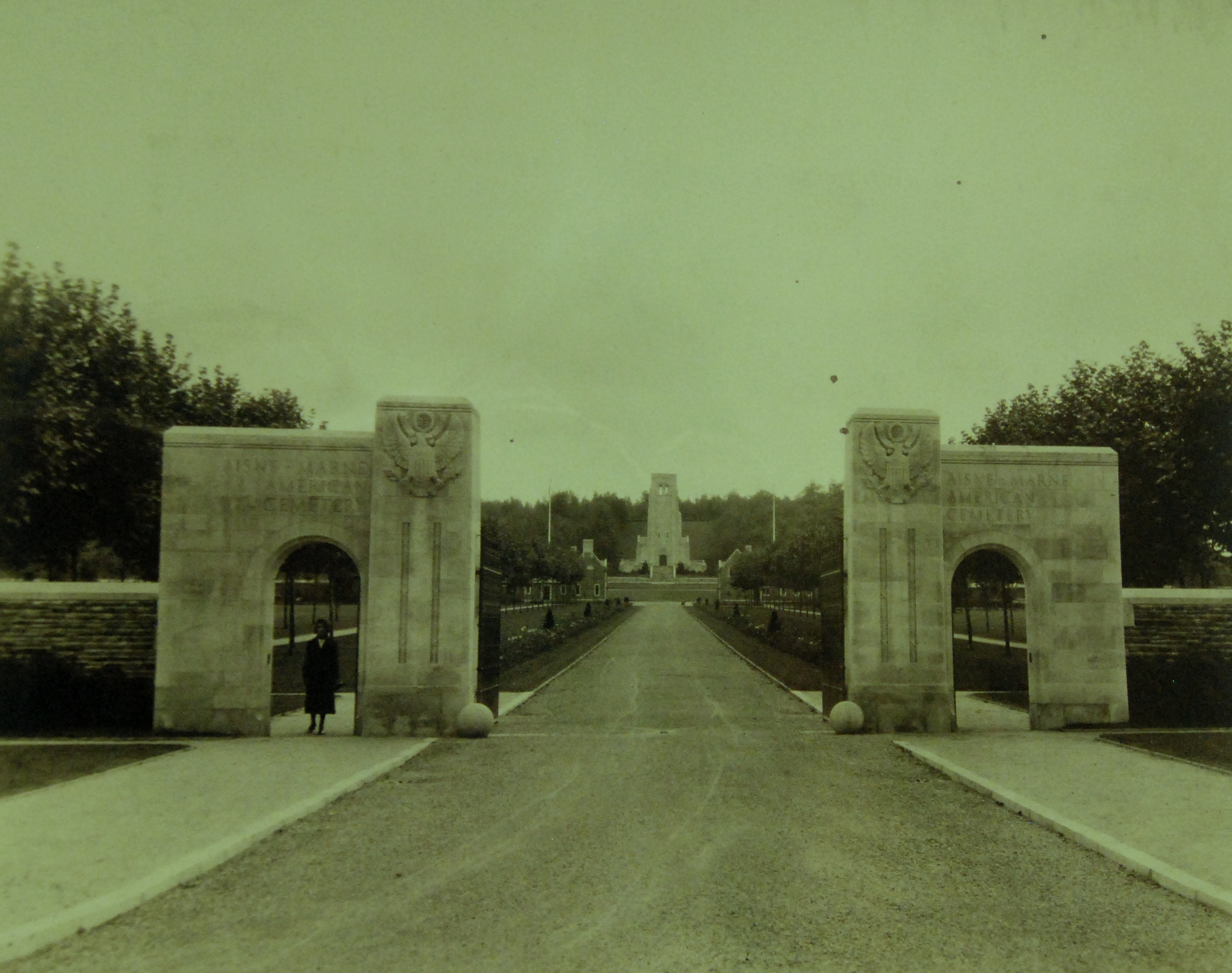
Entrance gate, 1923

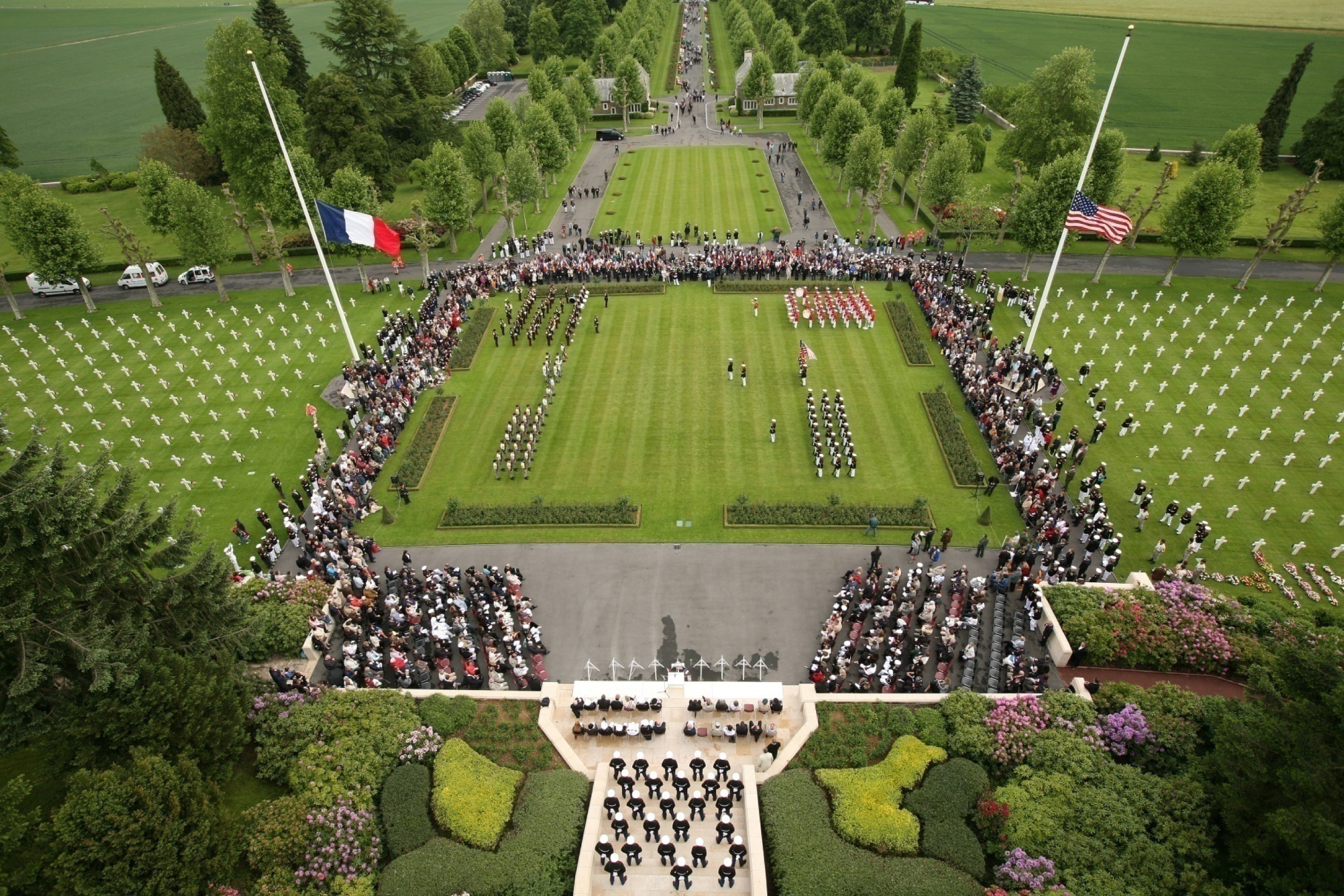
U.S. Marines and French soldiers during the 93rd anniversary service of the Battle for Belleau Wood in 2011.

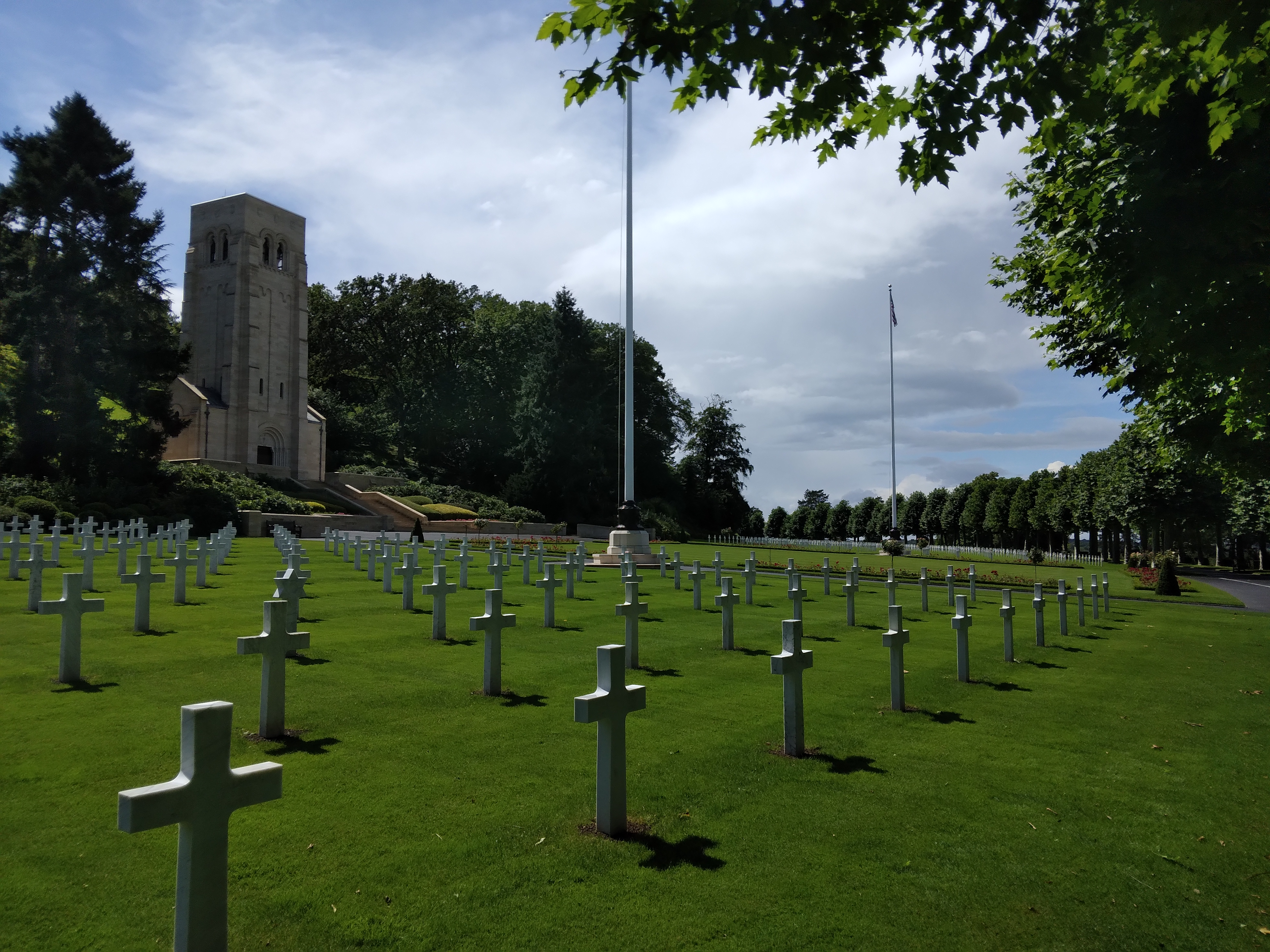

== See also ==
- World War I memorials
