= Battle of Château-Thierry (1918) =

Battle of World War I in France

- Part of the Second Battle of the Marne on the Western Front of World War I
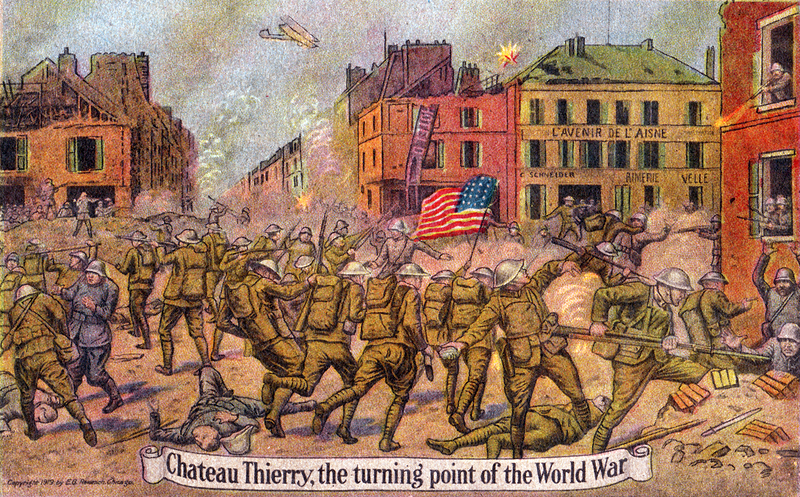
Date	late May to early June 1918
Location	Château-Thierry, Aisne, France 49°2′31″N 3°22′19″E
Result	Allied victory

Belligerents
France; United States	(German Empire) Germany

Commanders and leaders
(French Third Republic) Charles Mangin (United States) John J. Pershing	(German Empire) Erich Ludendorff

Casualties and losses
1,908 casualties	5,328 casualties

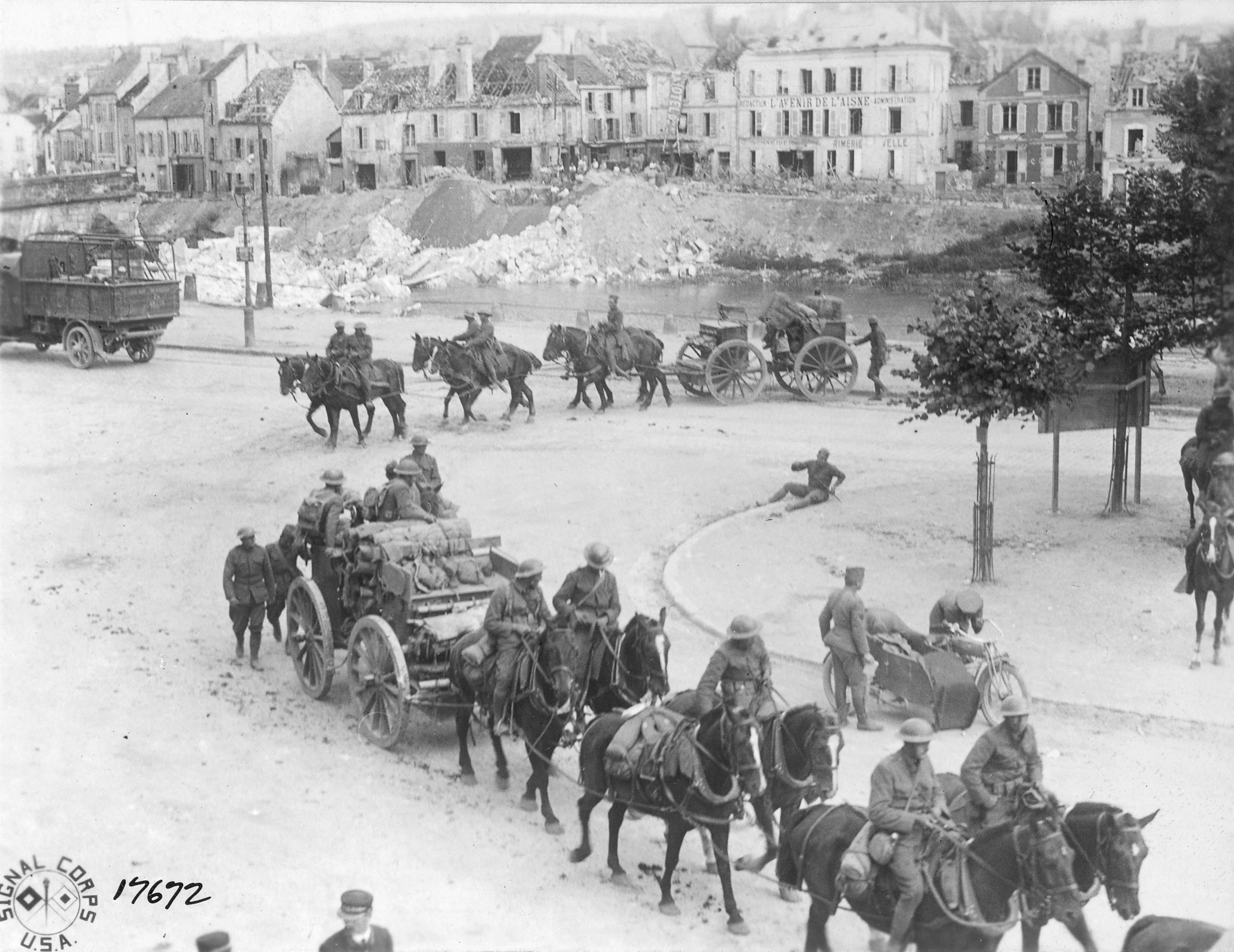
U.S. field artillery at Château-Thierry

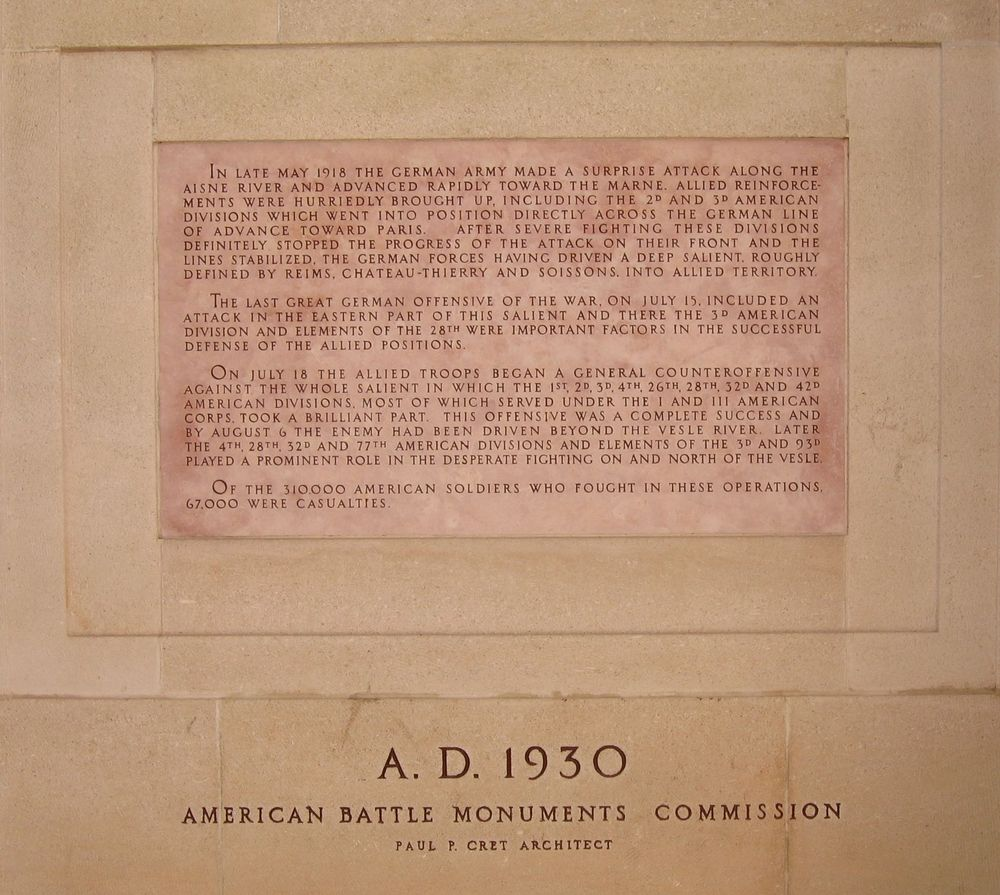
Plaque from the American monument at the site of the battle

The Battle of Château-Thierry was fought from late May to early June 1918 and was one of the first actions of the American Expeditionary Forces (AEF) under General John J. Pershing. It was a battle in World War I as part of the Second Battle of the Marne, initially prompted by a German Spring Offensive. German and local actions at Château-Thierry recommenced on May 31 to July 22, 1918, against the AEF, an American Expeditionary Force, consisting of troops from both the United States Army and Marine Corps units. These units from the 2nd Infantry Division were the newest troops on the front in France and just barely out of training.

The AEF counter-offensive combat action at Château-Thierry was relatively brief starting on July 1, 1918 and lasting for less than a week and was part of the allied effort to push back the recent German advance. American forces had linked up with their French allies at the Marne River on June 3, 1918 and had forced the Germans back across the river. This set the stage for the action at Château-Thierry and at the Battle of Belleau Wood. However, the later action raged for another three weeks.

== Background ==
Despite the revolution in Russia, fortune seemed to favor the Allies with the arrival of the Americans in France. However, these troops needed time to train before they could be combat effective. Recognizing the window of opportunity, General Ludendorff consolidated the manpower freed up from the Eastern Front to conduct Operation Michael in order to split the Allies' lines. The successes of the German stormtrooper infiltration tactics earned Germany approximately 40 miles of territory. But the offensive lost momentum when it surpassed its supply lines.

From the arrival of the first American troops in France, General John Pershing, commander of the American Expeditionary Force, had refused to hand over his divisions to either British or French commanders, insisting on keeping them together as one army. Regular Army Buffalo Soldiers, African American ("colored") troops led by mainly white officers, of the four regiments of the 92nd and the 93rd infantry divisions, fought only under French command for the duration of the war, although experienced Black non-commissioned officers(NCOs) were often provided to other segregated volunteer units under American command – such as the 317th Engineer Battalion.

Although he was determined to keep American troops under American command, in the face of the success of the German onslaught, Pershing relented and sent a portion of his army to assist the French in blocking the German advance in May 1918.

== Prelude ==
Looking to expel British forces from Flanders, Ludendorff sought to divert the Allies' French reserves away from the region. In his Operation Blucher, Ludendorff aimed some of his forces at the Chemin des Dames and took the French Sixth Army by surprise. Driving on, the Germans were soon at the Marne River, situated under 50 miles from Paris. With Marshal Ferdinand Foch unable to acquire British assistance, General Pershing's chief of operation, Colonel Fox Conner, recognized the gravity of the situation and ordered the 3rd Division to block them.

The 3rd Division occupied the main bridge on the south bank of the Marne River that led in Château-Thierry on 31 May 1918 as the French 10th Colonial Division rendezvoused with them from the north bank. The Americans positioned their machine guns to cover the French retreat, and had a unit led by Lt. John Bissell situated north of the second bridge. The French spent the night adding explosives to the bridges to destroy them. Early the following morning, 1 June, the Germans advanced into Château-Thierry from the north, forcing the French to the main bridge, which they defended with the support of American machine-gun fire. The French succeeded in destroying the bridge as the Americans kept up their fire on the Germans. Lt. Bissell's group was still on the north side of the Marne. They worked their way back to the secondary bridge in-between American machine-gun fire and made it across, along with a group of Germans that were captured shortly afterwards. From the north of the Marne on 2 June, the Germans engaged in heavy artillery and sniper fire against the Allies. They made an attempt to take the remaining bridge but were forced to end the assault as the casualties rose.

== Counter-Offensive action ==
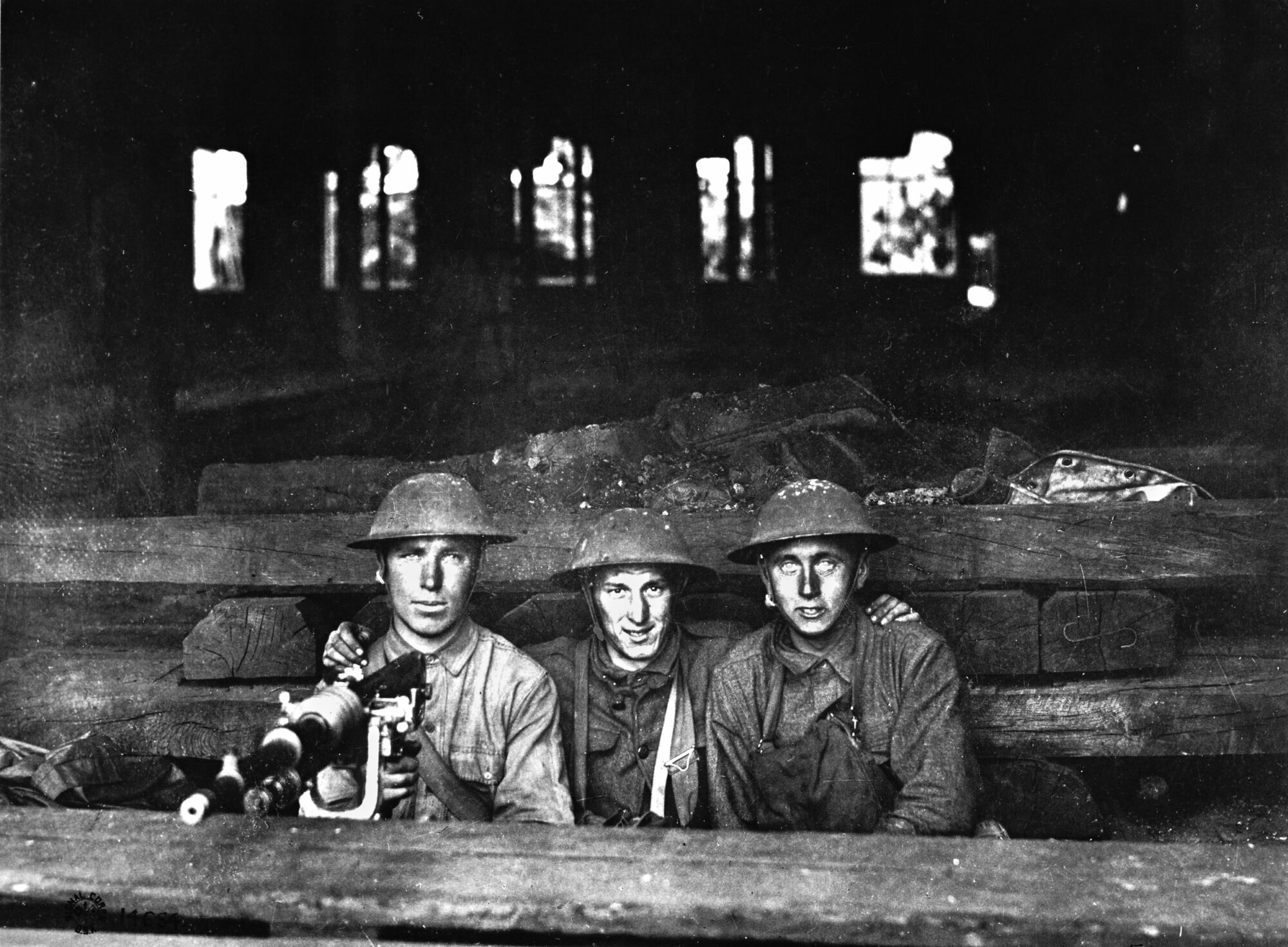
American soldiers man a machine-gun emplacement in a railroad building at Chateau-Thierry.

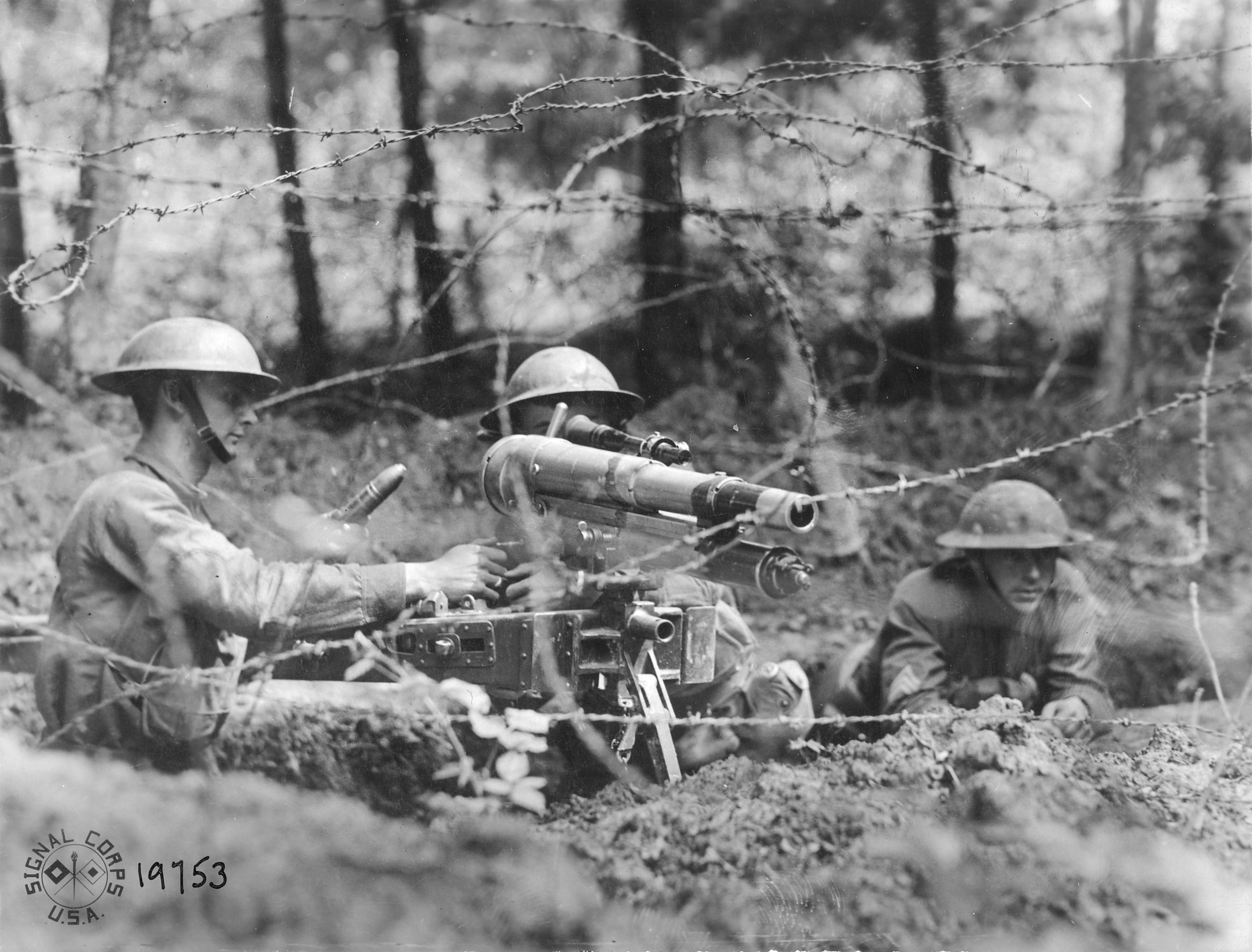
American soldiers manning a 37mm gun on a parapet in a second-line trench.

On the morning of 1 July 1918, the combined French and American forces, under the overall direction of Allied Generalissimo Ferdinand Foch, launched a general counter-assault on a 40 km (25 mi) wide front between Fontenoy and Château-Thierry, the first Allied offensive in the area in over a year. The American army played a role fighting for the regions around Soissons and Château-Thierry, in collaboration with predominantly French forces. The 3rd Brigade of the 2nd US Division led the attack on the strategic town of Vaux. The Allies had managed to keep their plans a secret, and their attack took the Germans by surprise. The troops went "Over the Top" without a preparatory artillery bombardment, but instead followed closely behind a synchronized rolling barrage. The assaults penetrated German lines and individual American units exercised initiative and continued fighting despite being nominally behind enemy lines. The town of Vaux was in American hands by the end of the day.

== Memorials ==
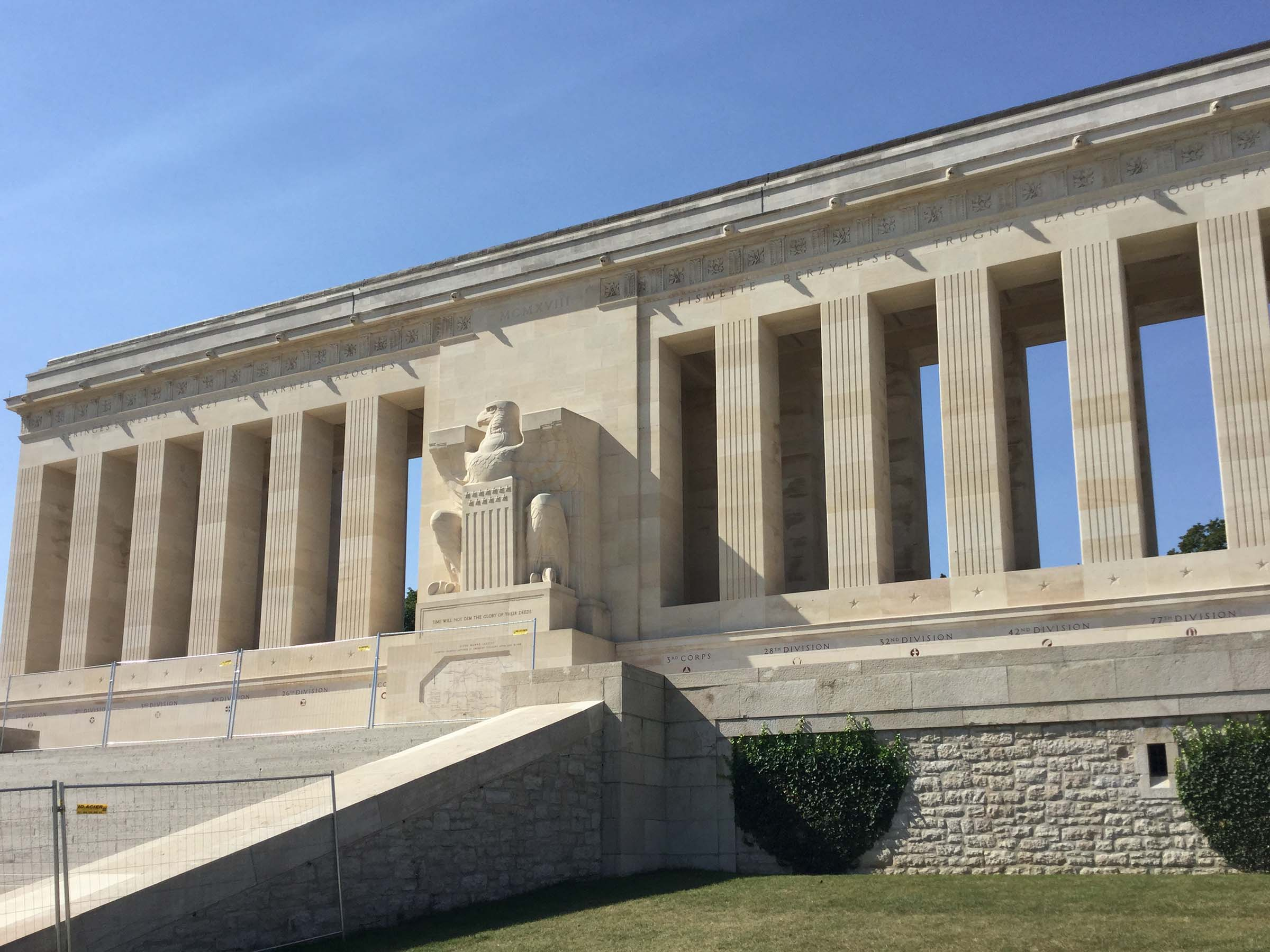
Château-Thierry Monument

After World War I, a memorial was built on Hill 204, 2 miles (3 km.) west of the town for which it is named. The Château-Thierry Monument, designed by Paul P. Cret of Philadelphia, was constructed by the American Battle Monuments Commission "to commemorate the sacrifices and achievements of American and French fighting men in the region, and the friendship and cooperation of French and American forces during World War I."

There is also a monument in front of the Bronx County Courthouse in New York City that was presented by the American Legion on 11 November 1940. The monument consists of the "Keystone from an arch of the old bridge at Château-Thierry," which the monument notes was "Gloriously and successfully defended by American troops."

The first Filipino to die in World War I was Private Tomas Mateo Claudio who served with the U.S. Army as part of the American Expeditionary Forces to Europe. He died in the Battle of Chateau Thierry in France on 29 June 1918. The Tomas Claudio Memorial College in Morong Rizal, Philippines, which was founded in 1950, was named in his honor.

== In Literature ==
Walter Charles Robert's 1937 play Red Harvest is set at American Red Cross Hospital 111, a field hospital in Jouy-sur-Morin, during the Battle of Château-Thierry. Based on the diary of an American Red Cross nurse at the battle, the hospital staff experiences air raids and shell fire while attempting to the save the lives of wounded soldiers, many of them difficult surgical cases.

A chapter in Ken Follett's 2010 historical novel Fall of Giants is devoted to The Battle of Château-Thierry, depicted alternately from the point of view of a German character and an American one. Follett's account emphasizes the fact that the Americans were freshly arrived and for most of them this was the first experience of combat - yet they stood well the "baptism of fire" and were able to confront the far more experienced German troops.
