= Hôtel-Dieu of Château-Thierry =

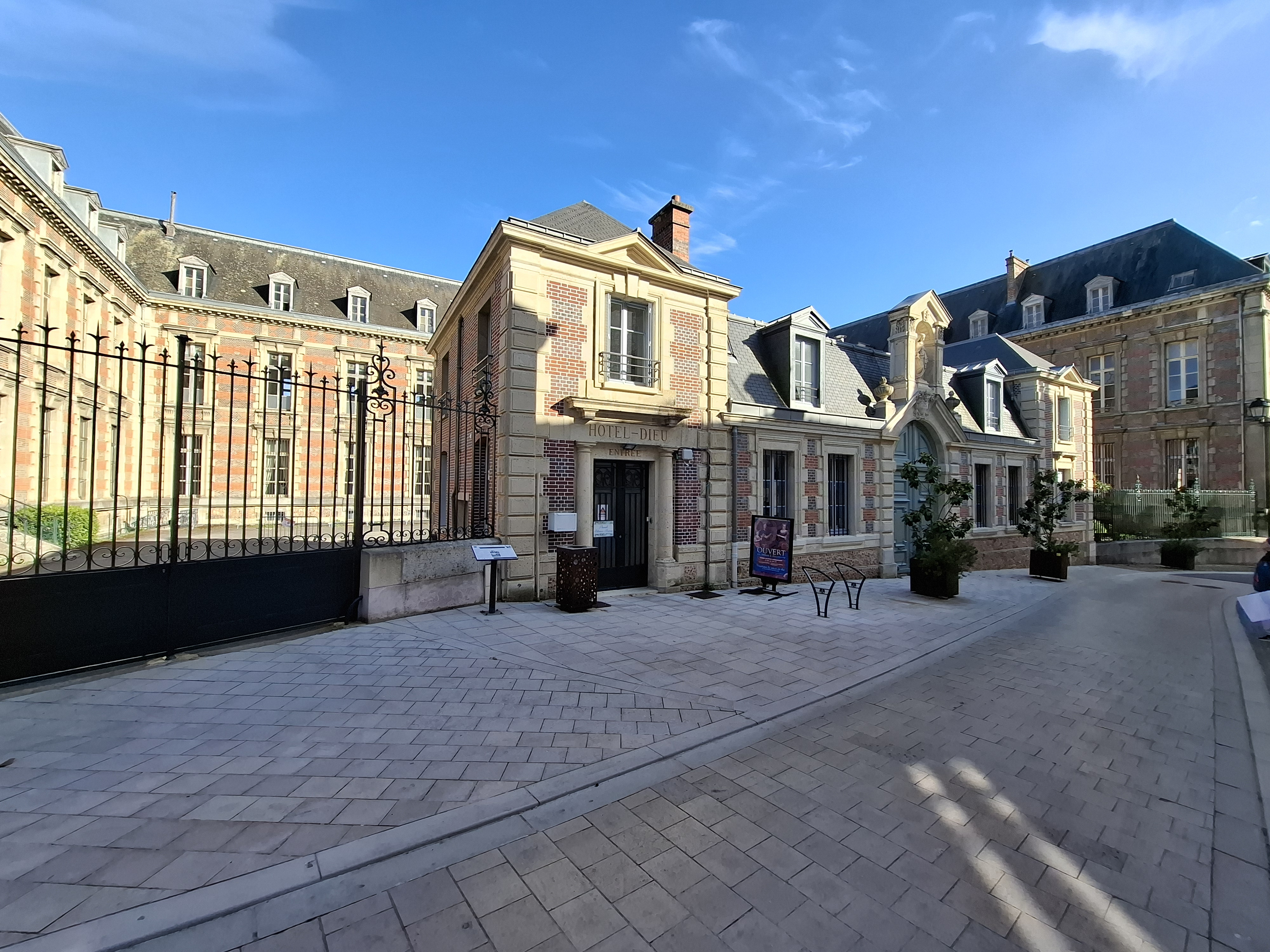
- Interactive map of Hôtel-Dieu of Château-Thierry

The Hôtel-Dieu is located in Château-Thierry, 90 km east of Paris.

== History ==
The Hôtel-Dieu in Château-Thierry was founded in 1304 by Joan I of Navarre, wife of King Philip IV of France.

The institution remained modest until 1698, when King Louis XIV placed twenty-eight leper hospitals (small hospitals caring for people with leprosy) in the surrounding region under its administration.

Over the centuries, the buildings were gradually expanded until they were demolished after 1870. Construction of a new hospital began in 1876 and was completed with its inauguration in 1879. During the construction works, patients were cared for at La Charité, now the Bellevue retirement home.

During the First World War, the Hôtel-Dieu treated numerous wounded soldiers, including the French poet and writer Guillaume Apollinaire.

The buildings were decommissioned in 1988, when a new modern hospital was built in Château-Thierry. The monument was listed as a Monument historique in 2007.
