= Château-Thierry American Monument =

World War I memorial in France

- France
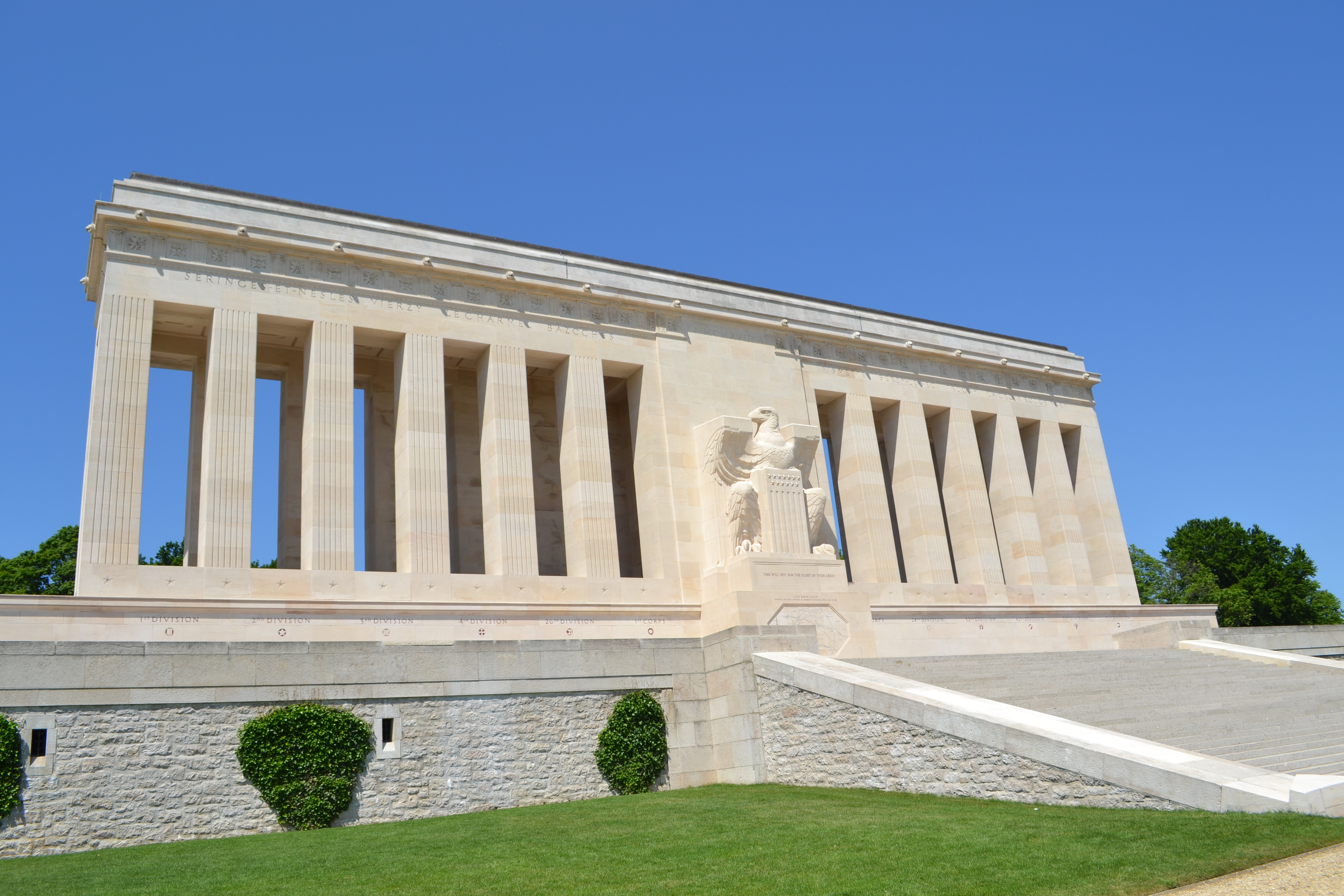
- For the involvement of US forces during World War I
- Location: 49°2′31″N 3°22′19″E near Château-Thierry, France
- Designed by: Paul Cret; Alfred Bottiau

The Château-Thierry American Monument is a World War I memorial, dedicated in 1937, located near Château-Thierry, Aisne, France. Architecturally, it is a notable example of Stripped Classicism.

== Situation ==
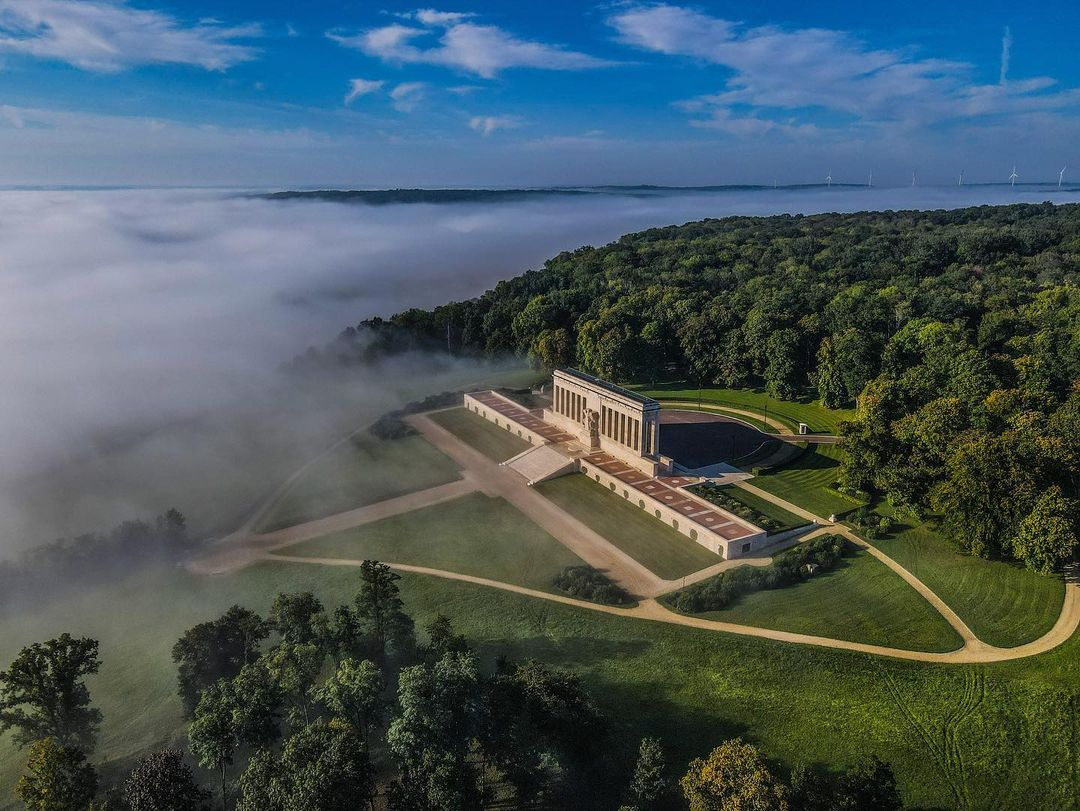
View of the Monument from the sky

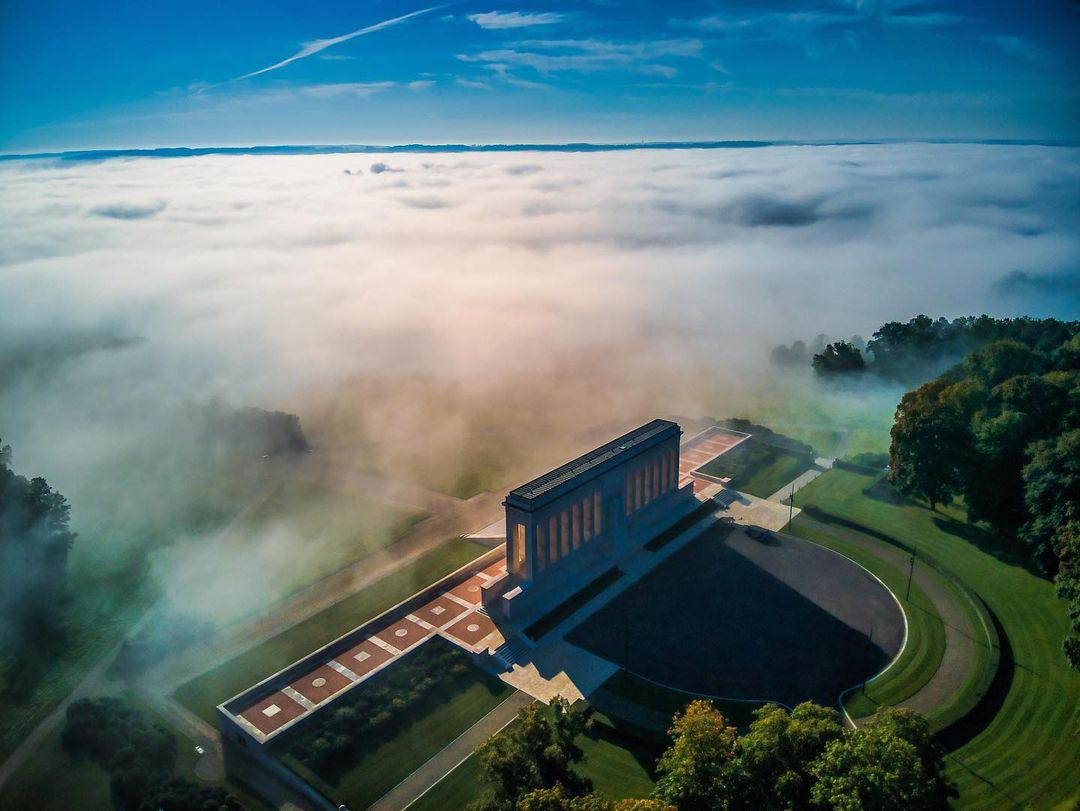
View from the sky

The memorial is situated upon Hill 204 and commands a wide view of the valley of the river Marne. It is located about 54 miles (87 km) east of Paris, 4.5 miles (7.2 km) southeast of the Aisne-Marne American Cemetery and Memorial, and 17 miles (27 km) southwest of the Oise-Aisne American Cemetery and Memorial. It commemorates the achievements of United States forces that fought in the region during World War I. In 1918, the 2nd and 3rd United States Infantry Divisions took part in heavy fighting around the area during the Second Battle of the Marne, which took place during the wider German spring offensive. The 4th Marine Brigade, which made a name for itself in the Battle of Belleau Wood, fought as part of the 2nd Infantry Division. The bodies of a number of US servicemen who were killed during the fighting are interred in cemeteries nearby. Two stone pylons mark the entrance to the memorial from Highway N-3 which runs from Paris to Château-Thierry. The monument consists of a double colonnade rising above a long terrace, as designed by Paul Philippe Cret. On its west facade are sculptured figures representing the United States and France. The sculptor was the French-American artist Alfred Bottiau. The English inscription reads, "This monument has been erected by the United States of America to commemorate the services of her troops and those of France who fought in this region during the World War. It stands as a lasting symbol of the friendship and cooperation between the French and American Armies." On its east facade is a map showing American military operations that took place in the region and an orientation table pointing out the significant battle sites. The Belleau Wood US Marines monument is located near the Aisne-Marne American Cemetery, about 9.3 km northwest.

== Gallery ==
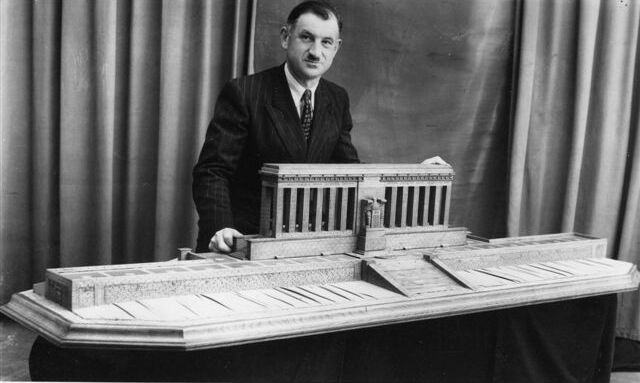
André Toison with a maquette

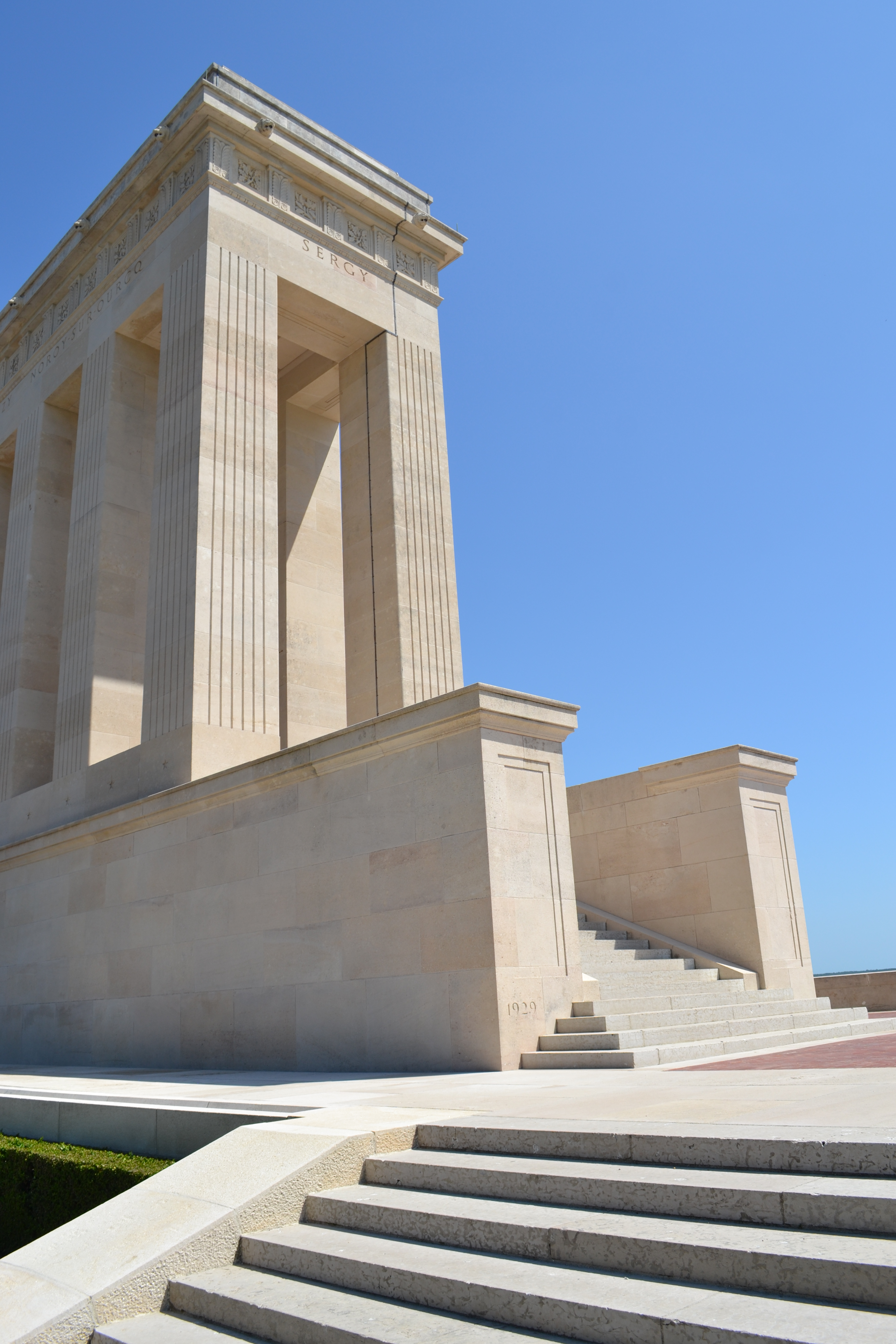
Detail of the building

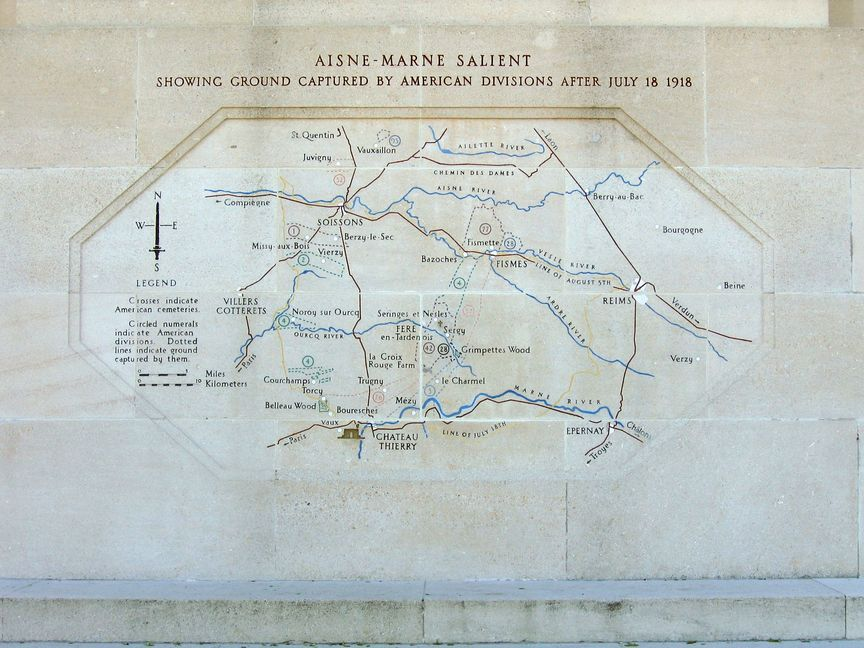
Battle map on the front of the monument

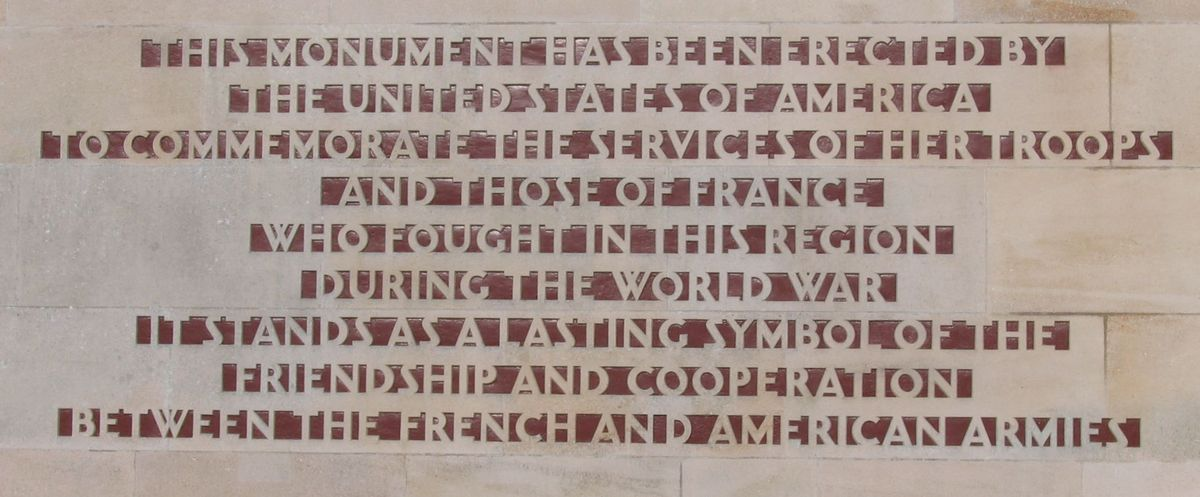
Dedication text in English
