= Musée Jean de La Fontaine =

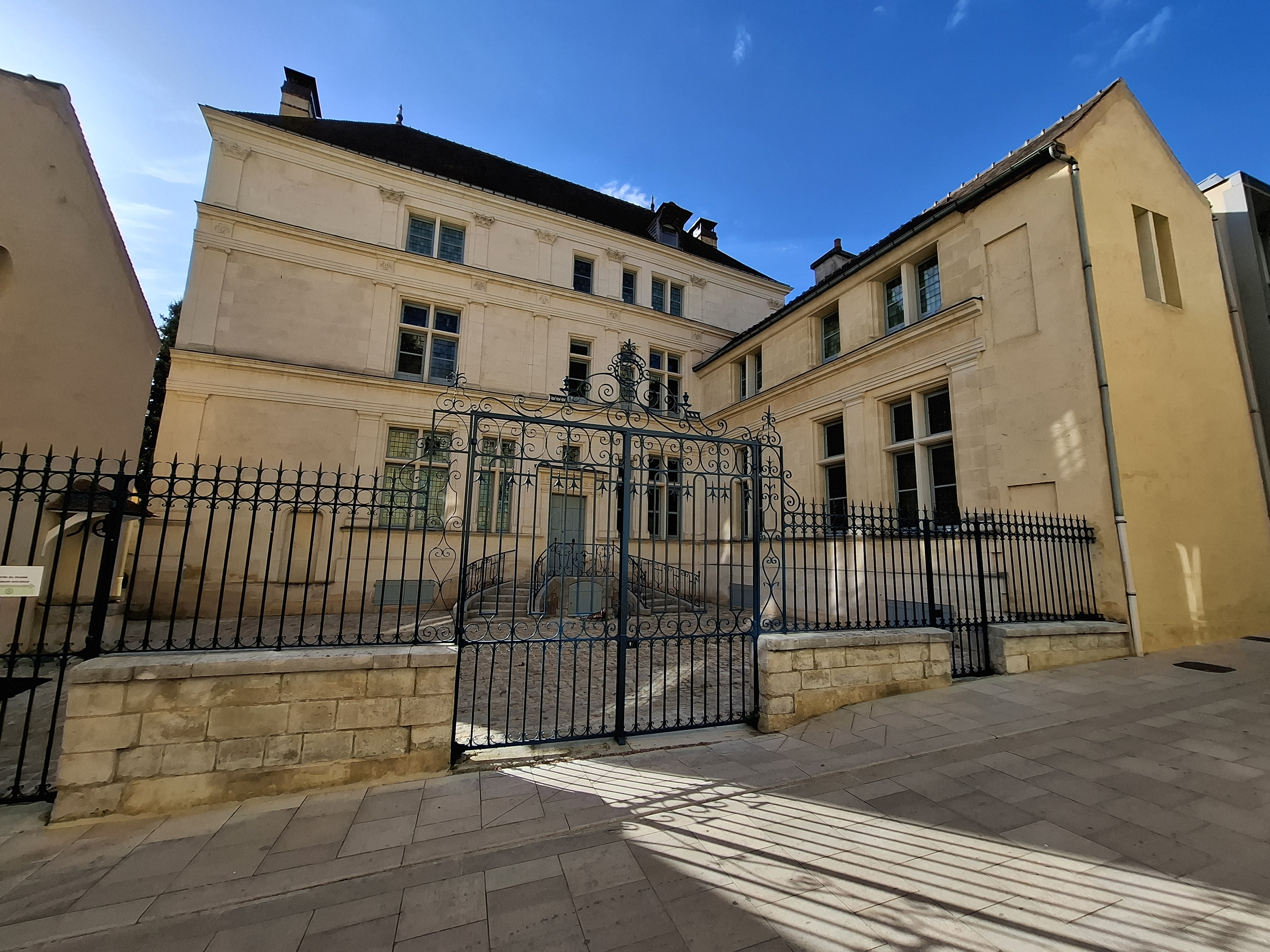
- Established: 1876
- Location: Château-Thierry
- Coordinates: 49.04675°N 3.399994°E
- Type: Art museum
- Website: https://www.museejeandelafontaine.fr/

The Musée Jean de La Fontaine is a writer's house museum located in Château-Thierry, France. It is housed in the former house of Jean de La Fontaine, a French fabulist, and is mostly dedicated to collections and objects representing Jean de La Fontaine's work.

== History ==
Fontaine was born and raised in the house which would later become the museum. He sold the house in 1676.
