= Château-Thierry =

- Subprefecture
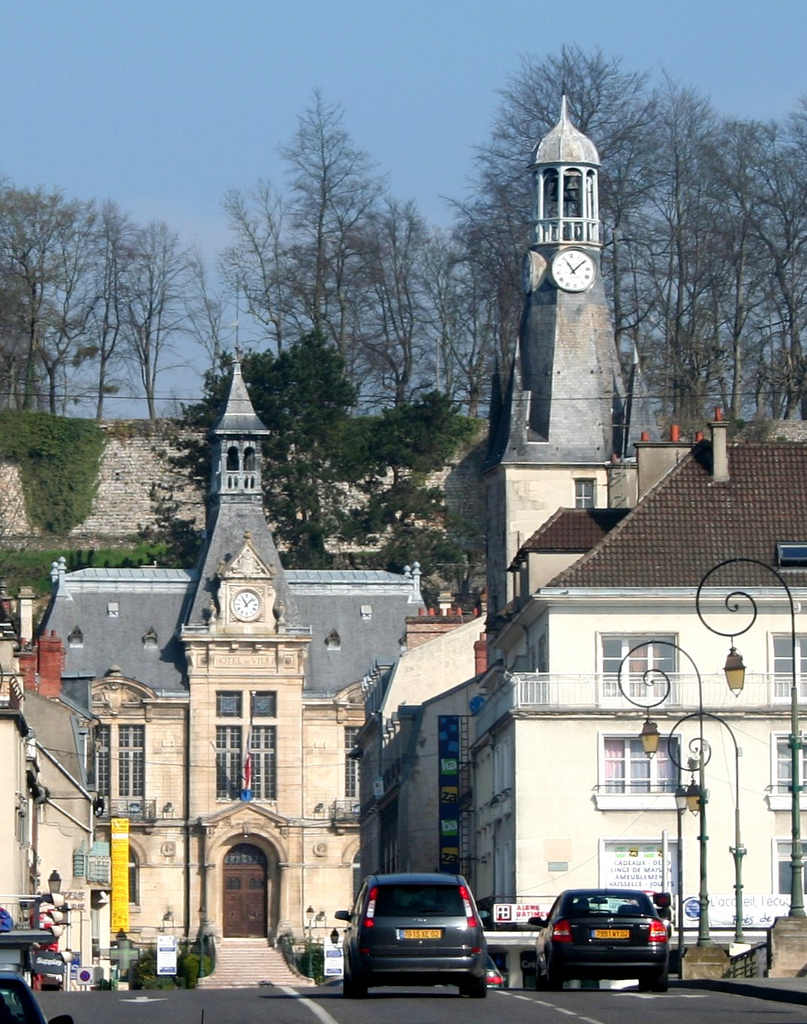
- Town hall

- Coat of arms
- Location of Château-Thierry
- Location within France Location within Hauts-de-France
- Coordinates: 49°02′N 3°24′E
- Country: France
- Region: Hauts-de-France
- Department: Aisne
- Arrondissement: Château-Thierry
- Canton: Château-Thierry
- Intercommunality: CA Région de Château-Thierry

Government
  - Mayor (2026–32): Sébastien Eugène (MRSL)
- Area^{1}: 16.55 km^{2} (6.39 sq mi)
- Elevation: 63 m (207 ft)
- Highest elevation: 222 m (728 ft)
- Lowest elevation: 59 m (194 ft)
- Population (2023): 15,097
  - Density: 912.2/km^{2} (2,363/sq mi)
- Time zone: UTC+01:00 (CET)
  - Summer (DST): UTC+02:00 (CEST)
- INSEE/Postal code: 02168 /02400
- ^{1} French Land Register data, which excludes lakes, ponds, glaciers > 1 km^{2} (0.386 sq mi or 247 acres) and river estuaries.

Château-Thierry (French: [ʃɑto tjeʁi]; Picard: Catieu-Thierry) is a French commune situated in the department of the Aisne, in the administrative region of Hauts-de-France, and in the historic Province of Champagne.

The origin of the name of the town is unknown. The local tradition attributes it to Theuderic IV, the penultimate Merovingian king, who was imprisoned by Charles Martel, without a reliable source. Château-Thierry is the birthplace of Jean de La Fontaine and was the location of the First Battle of the Marne and Second Battle of the Marne. The arrondissement of Château-Thierry is called the country of Omois. Château-Thierry is one of 64 French towns to have received the Legion of Honour.

== History ==
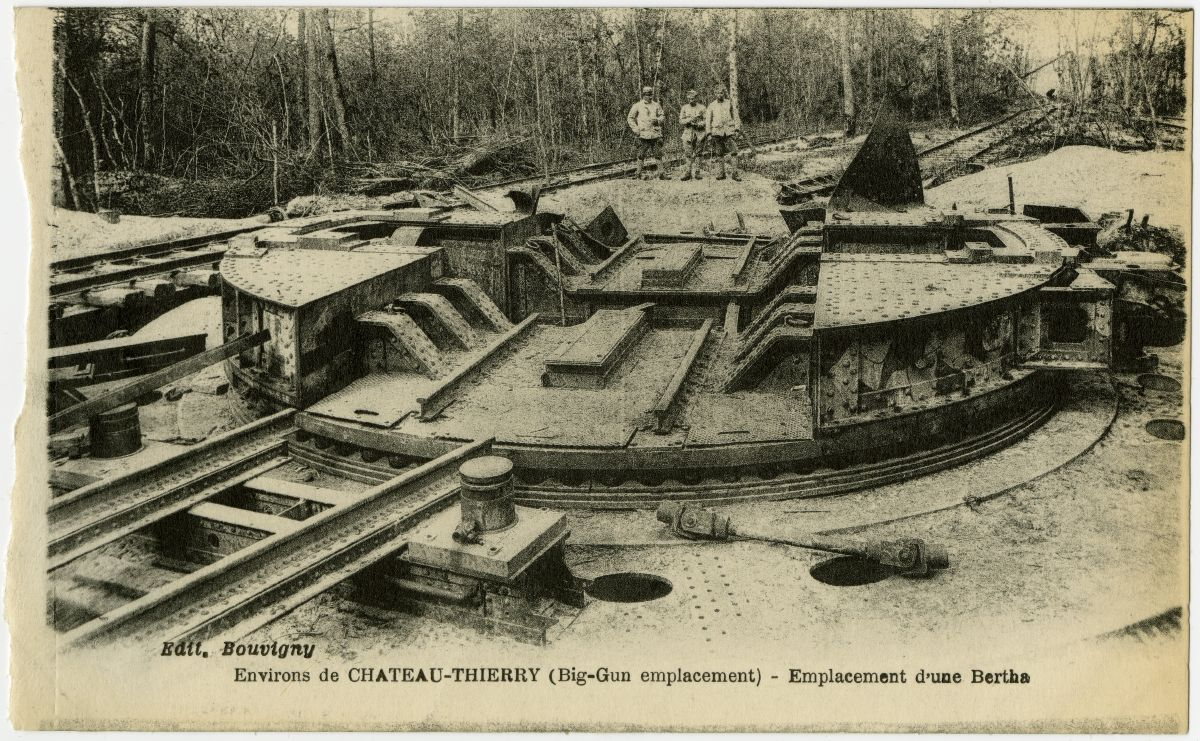
Postcard from World War I showing the mounting of the Paris Gun

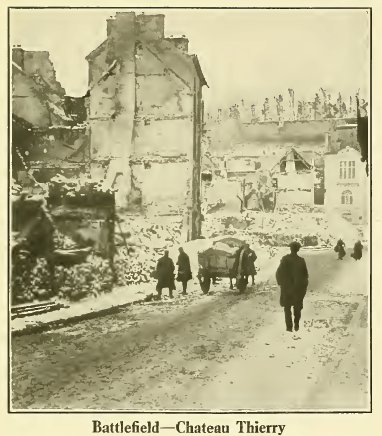
Battlefield of Chateau-Thierry in 1920.

In the late years of the western Roman empire, a small town called Otmus was settled on a site where the Soissons-Troyes road crossed the Marne river. During the 8th century, Charles Martel kept king Theuderic IV prisoner in the castle of Otmus. At this time, the town took the name of Castrum Theodorici, later transformed in Château-Thierry (Castle of Thierry, Thierry is the French or early Roman language translation of Theuderic).

In 946, the castle of Château-Thierry was the home of Herbert le-Vieux, Count of Omois of the House of Vermandois and Soissons.

Château-Thierry became "Royal" when Joan I, Queen of Navarre and Countess of Champagne, married the King of France Philippe IV le Bel.

Formerly the capital of the district of Brie Pouilleuse, Château-Thierry was captured by the English in 1421; by Charles V, Holy Roman Emperor, in 1544; and by the duke of Mayenne in 1591. The 30 July 1429, Joan of Arc freed the town without a single fight.

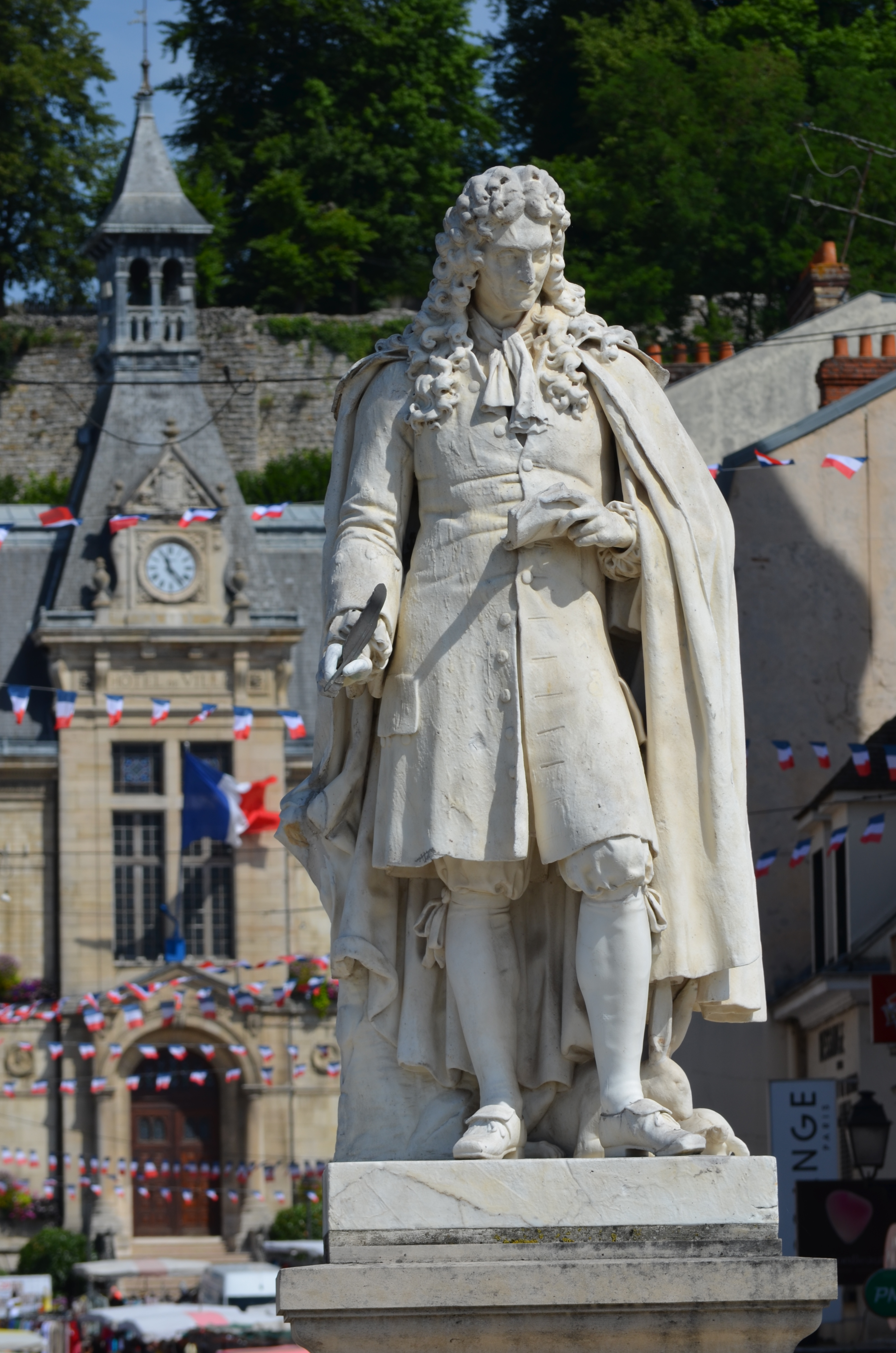
Statue of Jean de La Fontaine in the city center

The French fabulist Jean de La Fontaine was born in Château-Thierry in 1621 and lived there. His house is now converted into a museum.

Château-Thierry was the site of two important battles: the Battle of Château-Thierry (1814) in the Napoleonic Wars between France and Prussia, and the Battle of Château-Thierry (1918) in World War I between the United States and Germany. Quentin Roosevelt, the youngest son of President Theodore Roosevelt, was killed in aerial combat over Château-Thierry in 1918.

In 1918, a mounting for the Paris Gun was found near the castle, though the cannon itself had apparently been moved prior to the emplacement's discovery.

== Geography ==
Château-Thierry is situated in the Marne Valley. In this area, urban development extends throughout the valley, from the riverbed to the top of the flower-covered hillsides. Château-Thierry is culturally part of the Champagne area. The town lies at the crossroads of three administrative regions: Hauts-de-France, to which it belongs, towards the north; Île-de-France towards the west; and Grand Est, towards the east. The town's landscape is typical of a Champagne town, with its hillsides and vineyards. Its location in the Marne Valley, along with its transport network (a motorway and railway line from Paris to Strasbourg), make Château-Thierry a town in eastern France, in the greater Paris area. Here are some distances to neighboring cities:

Paris: 85 km or 52 miles; Reims: 51 km or 31 miles; Troyes: 107 km or 66 miles; Meaux: 45 km or 27 miles; Soissons, 40 km or 24 miles; and Épernay: 45 km or 27 miles.

The town is at the heart of the Omois local region, which roughly corresponds to the arrondissement of Château-Thierry.

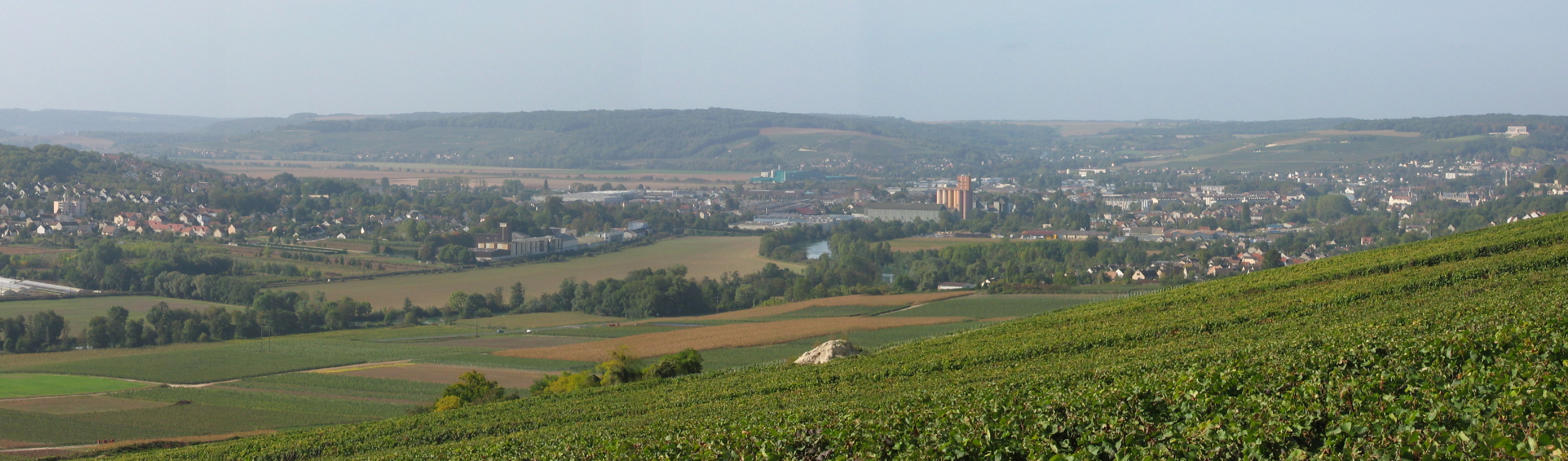
Château-Thierry

== Culture, heritage and tourism ==
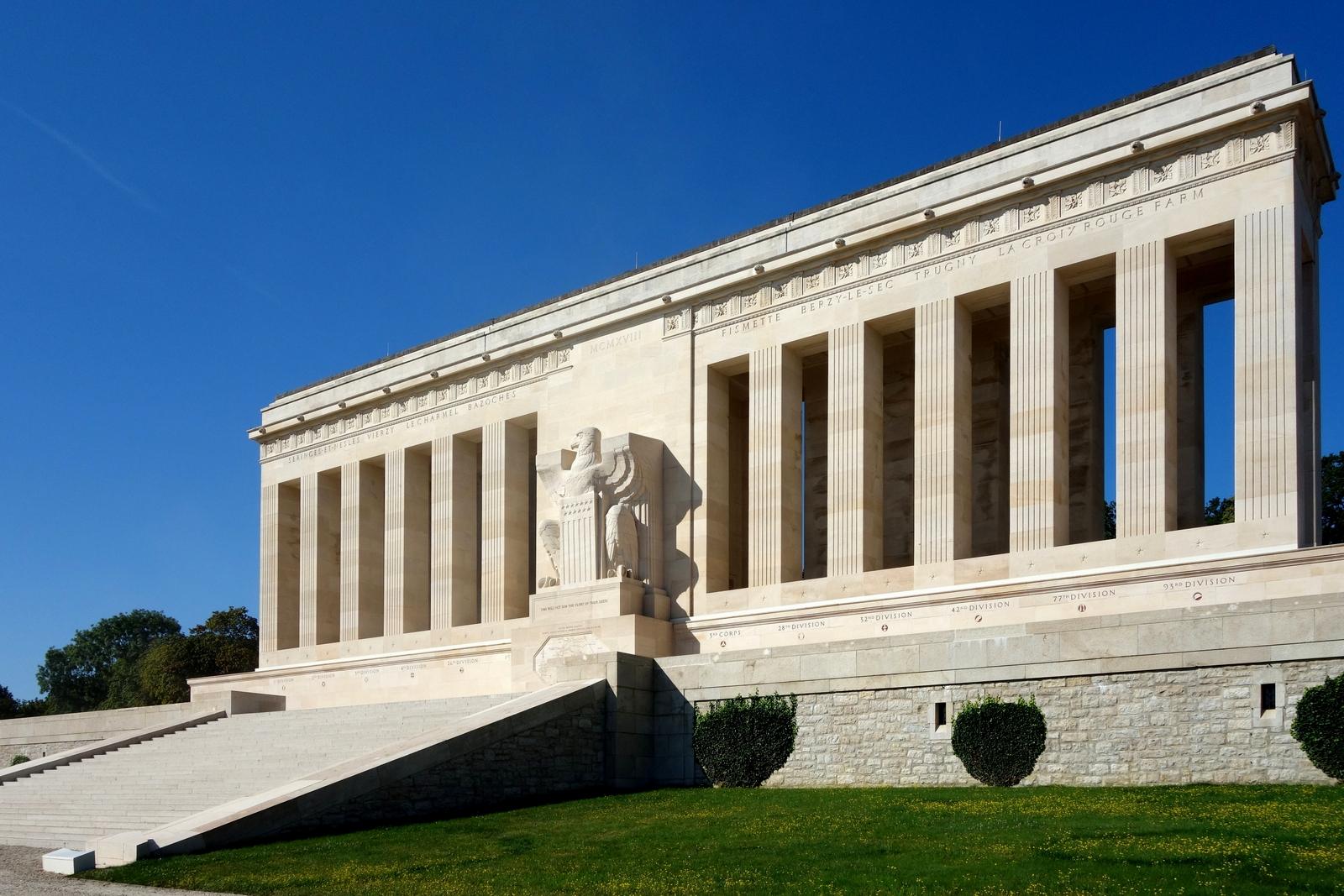
American monument

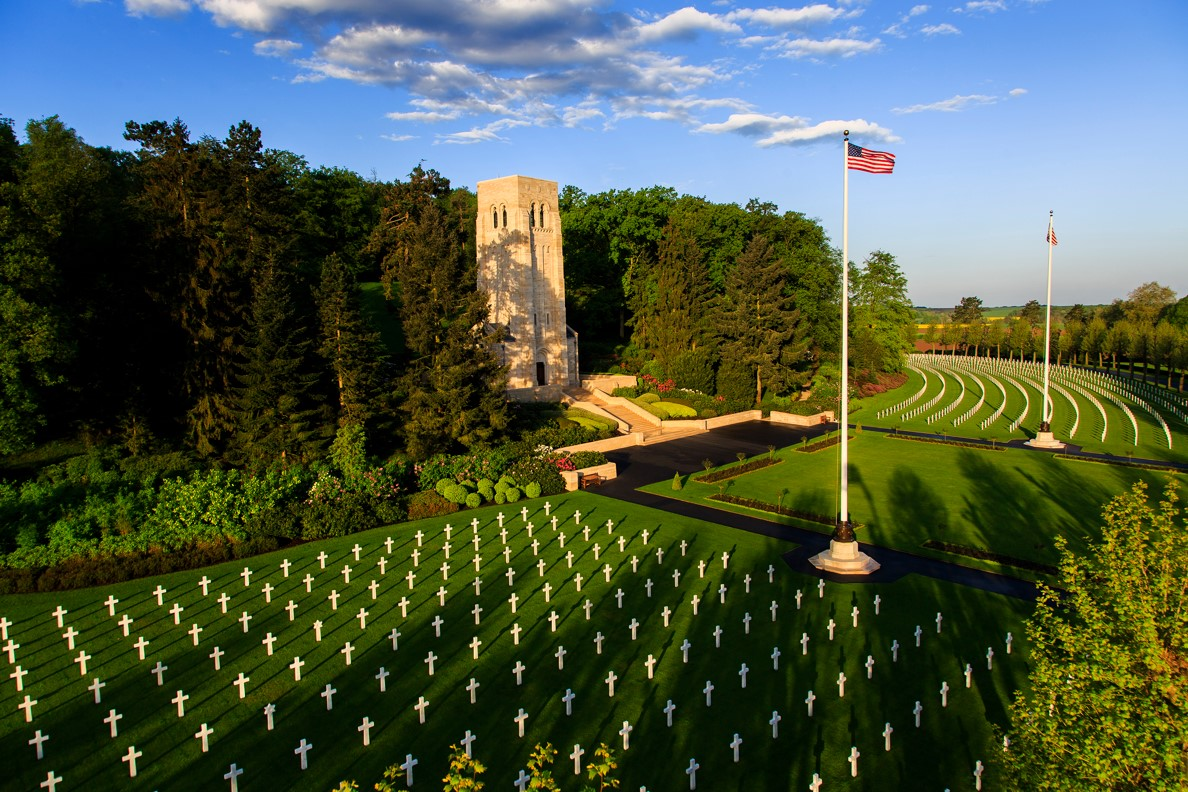
Aisne-Marne American Cemetery and Memorial

Château-Thierry is known in the United States for its proximity to the site of the Battle of Belleau Wood. The battle was the first victory of the US Marines outside of American soil. A memorial has been built on the hills overlooking the town. In the basement of the American Monument is a small museum about the history of the Battle of Belleau Wood. Every year, US Marines come to the town to pay tribute to the soldiers of the First World War. President Macron chose to present an oak tree from Belleau Wood as a diplomatic gift to President Trump. They planted the tree together in the White House gardens. President Biden came to Château-Thierry in 2024 to pay tribute to the American soldiers. The town welcomes many American tourists each year who come to visit the Aisne-Marne American Cemetery and Memorial.

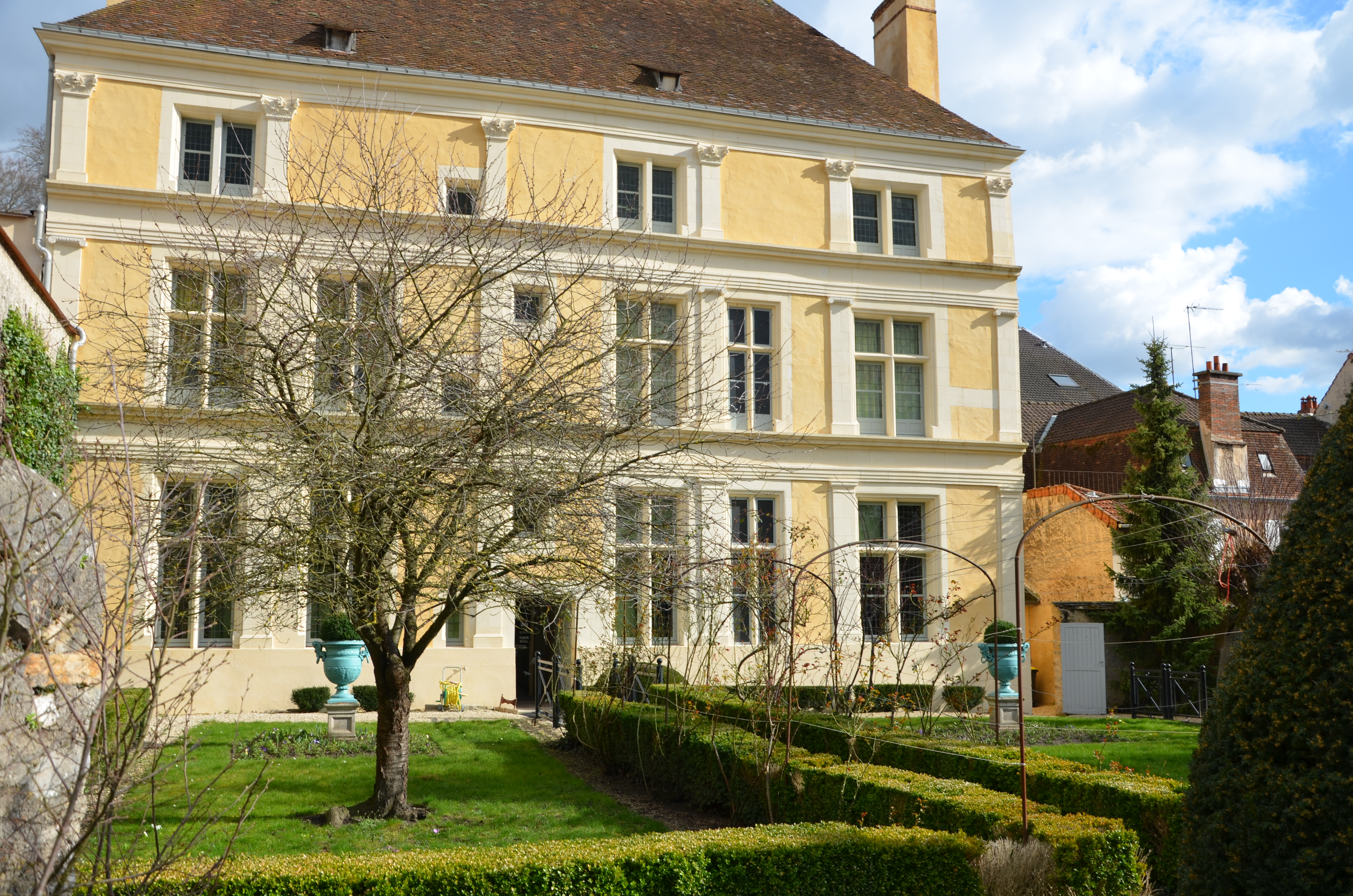
Museum Jean de La Fontaine

Château-Thierry is the birthplace of Jean de La Fontaine. His XVI century private mansion is now a museum. It houses a significant collection of the artist's work.

On the heights overlooking the town stands the medieval castle with its ramparts. To reach the castle, one can pass through the Saint-Pierre gate, which features a plaque recounting the liberation of the town by Joan of Arc in 1429. There are regular events, shows, and reenactments of medieval battles.

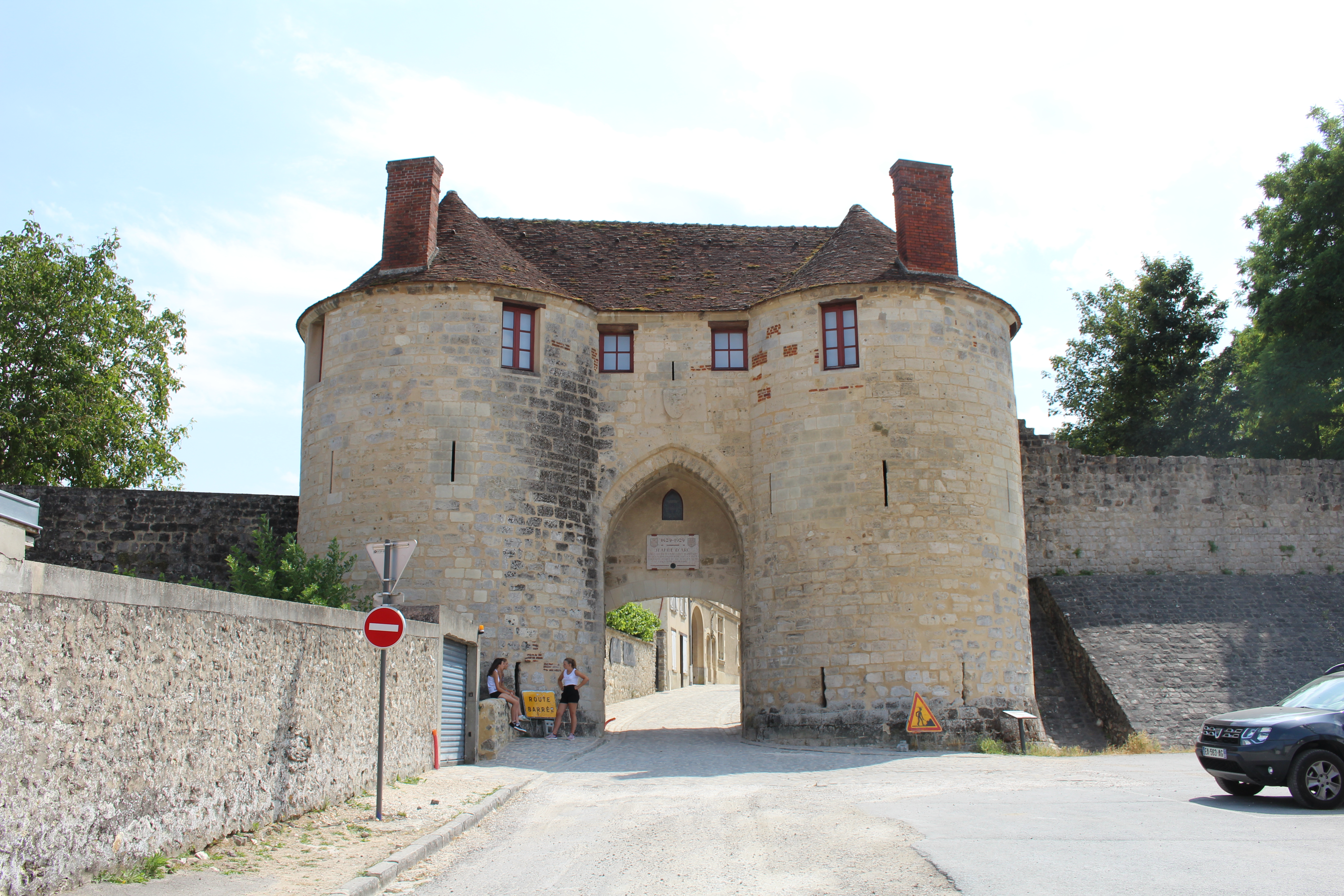
Saint Pierre Gate

In the city center is the Hôtel-Dieu Museum. This is a former hospital founded by Queen Joan I of France in 1304. This hospital was important for the region during the Middle Ages and served as a hospital until 1980. It welcomed famous guests such as the poet Guillaume Apollinaire.

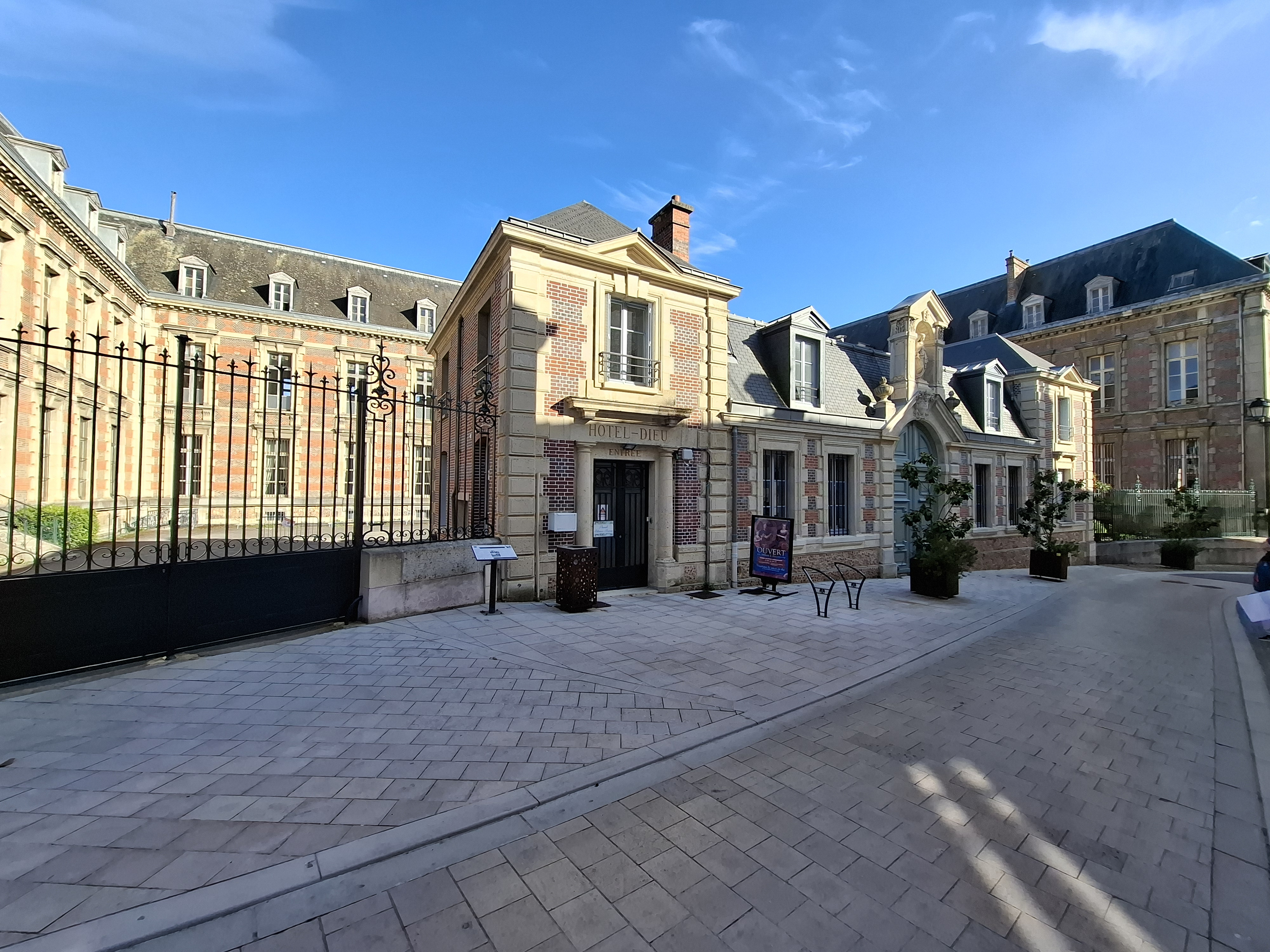
Hôtel-Dieu Museum

In the town center, you can stroll through the medieval streets and see medieval buildings such as the Balhan Tower (a former medieval keep) and the 12th-century Church of Saint Crepin. The town has managed to retain an authentic character with historic buildings in the town center and modern residential neighborhoods on the outskirts.

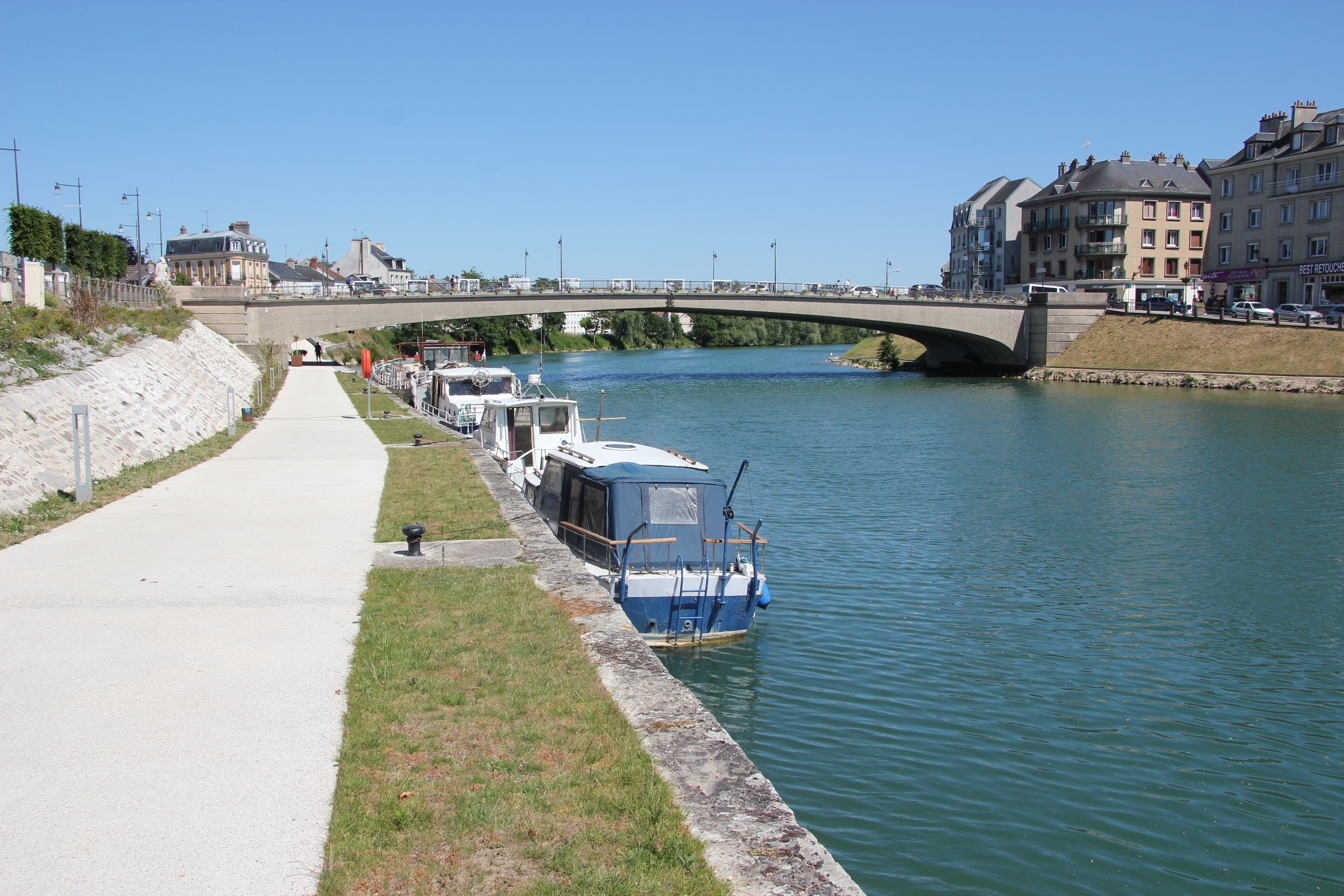
Banks of the Marne River in Château-Thierry

The city is bisected by the Marne River, which flows into the Seine in Paris. In the Middle Ages, the Marne River enabled the city to trade with Paris. The banks of the Marne River are a popular place for walks for locals and tourists alike. The city also enjoys river tourism with its barges.

Château-Thierry is also known for its Champagne. The town is located in the historic Champagne region. Visitors can tour the medieval cellars of the Champagne Pannier company and taste their champagne.

The town has sufficient hotel capacity to accommodate many tourists. There is also a golf course, museums, and other activities.

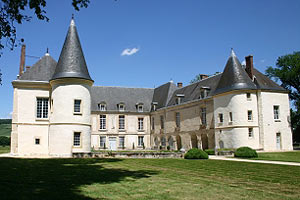
Château de Condé

Near Château-Thierry lies the Château de Condé. This former princely residence is now a private estate open to the public. It is a historic site where important figures such as Mazarin and Cardinal Richelieu have stayed.

=== Neighboring Municipalities ===
The neighbouring municipalities are: Bézu-Saint-Germain , Bouresches , Brasles , Chierry , Épaux-Bézu , Essômes-sur-Marne , Étampes-sur-Marne , Étrépilly , Nogentel and Verdilly.

== Transport ==
Château-Thierry station is the terminus station of a regional railway line starting from the Gare de l'Est in Paris. Furthermore, it has rail connections to Châlons-en-Champagne, Nancy and Strasbourg. It is also one of the exits of the A4 autoroute that links Paris with the east part of France. Transval operates the local bus routes.

== Personalities ==
- Walter of Château-Thierry (died 1249) a French theologian and scholastic philosopher.
- Samuel ben Solomon of Falaise 13th-century rabbi (one of the proponents of the Talmud during the Disputation of Paris).
- Joan I (1273-1305), Queen of France, founded the Hôtel-Dieu in Château-Thierry. During the Middle Ages, it was an important hospital for the region; today it has been converted into a museum.
- Joan of Arc (1412-1431) freed the town without a single fight 30 July 1429
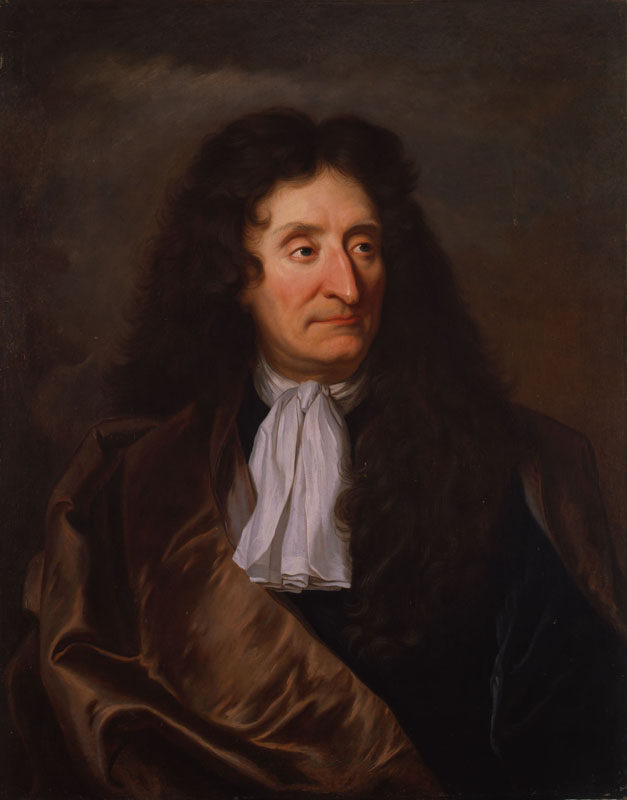
- Jean de La Fontaine (1621-1695)
  Jean de La Fontaine (1621–1695), a fabulist and poet, known best for his Fables.
- Jean-Baptiste Dumangin (1744–1826), French physician who performed the autopsy of Louis XVII.
- Napoleon (1769-1821), French general and Emperor, won a victory against the Prussians at Château-Thierry 12 February 1814
- Louis Jean-Baptiste Leseur (1774–1818), army general of the French First Republic and the First French Empire.
- Chevalier de Saint-Georges (1745–1799), a French Creole virtuoso violinist and composer
- Antoine Menant (1762-1829), army general of the French First Republic and the First French Empire, born in Lyon and died in Château-Thierry.
- Charles Martigue (1777-1825), cavalry colonel of the armies of the French First Republic and the First French Empire.
- Jean Macé (1815–1894), an educator, journalist, active freemason and politician.
- Maurice Holleaux (1861–1932), 19th– to 20th-century French historian, archaeologist and epigrapher.
- Jules Guiart (1870-1965), parasitologist and medical historian, was born in the city.
- Achille Jacopin (1874-1958), sculptor.
- Guillaume Apollinaire (1880-1918), French poet and playwright, was treated at the Hôtel-Dieu hospital in Château-Thierry in 1916.
- François Aman-Jean (1894–1986) physician, surgeon, writer and playwright
- Theodore Roosevelt's son Quentin (1897–1918) was shot down while flying a French Nieuport 28 C.1 plane during WWI.
- Charles Schneider (1881-1953), glassworker.
- Ba Jin (1904–2005), a Chinese writer and intellectual, stayed here in 1927 and 1928.
- Andrée Hoppilliard, aeronautical engineer, was born here in 1909.
- Auguste Jordan (1909-1990), Austrian professional footballer who played on the French national team.
- Léon Hess, creator of the "Le Castel" gâteau du voyageur, who won a gold medal at the 1912 Exposition Culinaire Internationale in Paris.
- Nadia Tagrine (1917-2003), pianist.
- Manu Dibango (1933–2020) a Cameroonian musician and songwriter
- Yves Bot (1947–2019), magistrate.
- Pierre Bensusan (born 1957) a French-Algerian acoustic guitarist.
- The novel The Greengage Summer (1958) of Rumer Godden (1907–1998) is set in Château-Thierry.
- Antoine Le Gaudier (1572-1622), French jesuite writer, born in Château-Thierry
- Sylvain Lévignac, actor and stuntman, died in Château-Thierry.
- Charles Ferton père.
- Edmond de Tillancourt.
- Charles-Armand de Rougé.
- Guillaume-Benoît Houdet.

== Population ==
Historical population

Year	Pop.	±% p.a.
1793	4,080	—
1800	4,160	+0.28%
1806	4,730	+2.16%
1821	4,422	−0.45%
1831	4,697	+0.61%
1836	4,761	+0.27%
1841	4,995	+0.96%
1846	5,413	+1.62%
1851	5,629	+0.79%
1856	5,381	−0.90%
1861	5,761	+1.37%
1866	6,519	+2.50%
1872	6,623	+0.26%
1876	6,902	+1.04%
1881	7,015	+0.33%
1886	7,296	+0.79%
1891	6,863	−1.22%
1896	7,063	+0.58%
1901	7,083	+0.06%

Year	Pop.	±% p.a.
1906	7,347	+0.73%
1911	7,771	+1.13%
1921	7,751	−0.03%
1926	8,266	+1.29%
1931	8,154	−0.27%
1936	7,928	−0.56%
1946	8,094	+0.21%
1954	8,841	+1.11%
1962	10,006	+1.56%
1968	11,049	+1.67%
1975	13,491	+2.89%
1982	14,557	+1.09%
1990	15,312	+0.63%
1999	14,967	−0.25%
2007	14,794	−0.15%
2012	14,329	−0.64%
2017	15,107	+1.06%
2023	15,097	−0.01%

Source: EHESS and INSEE (1968-2023)

== Sights ==
- Castle walls
- Saint-Crépin church (15th century)
- Balhan tower
- Marne River
- World War I Aisne-Marne American Cemetery and Memorial (south of the village of Belleau)
- Chateau-Thierry American Monument (overlooking the town)
- Champagne vineyards
- Several churches

== Twin towns – sister cities ==
Château-Thierry is twinned with:

- Cisnădie, Romania (1997)
- Grybów (rural gmina), Poland
- Mosbach, Germany (1974)
- Pößneck, Germany (1989)

== See also ==
- Château de Condé
- Communes of the Aisne department
- US I Corps
