= Robert J. Butler =

Canadian businessman (1923–2007)

- Born: 18 February 1923; Toronto, Ontario
- Died: 3 May 2007 (aged 84); North York, Ontario
- Education: Vaughan Road Collegiate ('41); University of Toronto (BA '47)
- Occupation: Businessman
- Known for: President of Eaton's department store chain
- Spouse: Jean Gertrude Smith (m. 1947)
- Children: 4
- Military career
- Branch: Royal Canadian Air Force
- Rank: Flying officer
- Conflicts: World War II

Robert John Butler (18 February 1923 – 3 May 2007) was a Canadian businessman who served from 1969 to 1975 as the fifth president of Eaton's, and then from 1975 to 1977 as the company's chairman of the board. Butler was the first president of the company who was not a member of the Eaton family.

After serving in the air force and graduating from university, Butler began his career with Eaton's in the summer of 1947. Through the 1950s and early 1960s he received increasingly senior managerial posts, and in 1962 became manager for all Toronto stores. In 1964 Butler was elected a director of the company, and in 1968 became a vice-president. In April 1969, Butler succeeded John David Eaton as president of the company. He remained in office for five-and-a-half years and was succeeded by Earl Orser in March 1975.

Subsequently, Butler served for two years as chairman of the board before leaving the company in April 1977. From 1977 to 1981, Butler served in the Progressive Conservative Ontario provincial government of Bill Davis. Upon leaving the government he became chairman of the Urban Transportation Development Corporation. In the late 1980s and early 1990s he was associated with Reichmann family interests, serving as chairman of GW Utilities, as a director of Campeau Corporation, and from 1990 to 1993 as chairman of Gulf Canada. Butler died in Toronto in 2007 at age 84.

== Early life and education ==
Robert John Butler was born in Toronto on 18 February 1923 to Thomas Sidney Butler (1897–1980) and Elsie Emma Ravenscroft (1898–1983). Thomas and Elsie were both born in England and came to Canada in 1920. Elsie had been the first woman buyer for Austin Reed. In Toronto, Thomas worked as an assistant engineer for York Township. The Butlers had two children: Robert and Allan.

The Butlers lived at 133 Winnett Avenue in the Humewood neighbourhood of Toronto. Robert attended Humewood Public School and Vaughan Road Collegiate. He took his first job with Eaton's part-time in 1938 when he was 15. Butler graduated high school in 1941.

Upon graduation, Butler enlisted in the Royal Canadian Air Force. He served in World War II as a navigator in RAF Bomber Command and attained the rank of flying officer. After the war, Butler enrolled at Victoria College at the University of Toronto, where he graduated Bachelor of Arts in 1947. During university, he worked at Eaton's on Saturdays. Upon graduation he was accepted at Ohio State University for graduate study in business, but instead, began his professional career with Eaton's that summer.

== Career ==
Butler's first job with the company was as a manager of the comparison-shopping office. He then moved to the general merchandise office, the Toronto store merchandise office, and the housewares department of the main store, of which he became manager in the fall of 1956. In 1957 he was appointed assistant merchandise manager at the College Street store, and in 1960 was appointed merchandise manager in of the London store in anticipation for its opening in the fall of that year. Later in 1960 he returned to Toronto and was involved in planning the new store at Yorkdale Shopping Centre and simultaneously served as manager of the general merchandise office. In December 1961 he was appointed manager of national buying and merchandising. In 1962 he was appointed manager of the Toronto stores, and in 1963 he was appointed assistant general manager of the Ontario division.

In May 1964, butler was elected a director of the T. Eaton Co. and was made general manager of the Ontario division. In January 1965, following a reorganisation, Butler became manager of the central division. In July 1968, he was appointed vice-president of planning and development. Concurrently, he received directorships of associated Eaton companies including the T. Eaton Realty Co., the T. Eaton Acceptance Co., and the T. Eaton Life Assurance Co.

By 1969, Eaton's president John David Eaton, who turned 60 that year, was suffering from severe arthritis and was no longer up to the task of running the company. His two eldest sons and the next in line in the family succession, John Craig Eaton II and Fredrik Stefan Eaton, were then only 32 and 31 and were not yet ready to take over the business. Accordingly, the company turned to Butler to take over until the next generation of Eatons were old enough. On 6 August 1969, Butler, aged 46, succeeded John David to become Eaton's fifth president. Additionally, Butler succeeded David Kinnear as chief executive officer and was the first president to hold this secondary title. Upon Butler's succession, John David Eaton retired, while Kinnear became the company's first chairman of the board.

On 12 March 1975, Butler was succeeded as president and chief executive officer by Earl Orser. Concurrently, Butler was elected to the post of chairman of the board, which had been vacant since David Kinnear retired in May 1973. The rationale for the change was that the volume of work required of the president had been untenable for one man. Accordingly, as chairman, Butler would take his existing duties in long-range planning, while the new president would be responsible primarily for day-to-day operations.

Butler remained chairman for just over two years. In February 1977, premier Bill Davis announced that, effective 1 April, Butler would be appointed Deputy Minister of Consumer and Commercial Relations. Butler gave his first major speech on 2 May at the annual seminar of the Association of Canadian Advertisers. In January 1979, Butler became secretary of the Management Board of Cabinet. Butler left government in December 1981 and returned to the private sector. At that time, Butler was elected a director of the Urban Transportation Development Corporation. In August 1983, he was elected chairman of the UTDC.

In the late 1980s, Butler became associated with the Reichmann family business interests. In October 1988, Butler was elected chairman of GW Utilities Ltd., a subsidiary of Olympia & York. During the Olympia & York bailout of Campeau Corporation in the fall of 1989, Butler was elected to the new Campeau board as a representative of minority shareholders. In 1990, Butler was elected chairman of Gulf Canada. Butler remained chairman for three years, and in the summer of 1993 was succeeded by Earl Joudrie. In October of that year he resigned as a director.

== Personal life ==
On Saturday, 14 June 1947, Butler married Jean Gertrude Smith (1923–2020) at the since-demolished St Paul's Presbyterian Church at Bathurst and Barton in Toronto. The Butlers had four children: Robert, Donald, Debbie, and Jennifer. In 1964, Robert and Jean purchased a house at 38 Saintfield Avenue in the Bridle Path. The house was furnished entirely with Eaton's furniture, and it was displayed in a 1970 home tour. After he became president of Eaton's, the Toronto Star published an extensive profile on him. In the interview, he stated, "I don't know how this sits in Toronto, but my wife and I are not particularly prone to the social circuit. I don't happen to drink, for one thing. We're a very close family. We have a summer cottage. We play tennis aggressively, we go to ski chalets in the winter."

Butler died at Sunnybrook Health Sciences Centre on 3 May 2007 at the age of 84. A celebration of life was held on 15 May at the Thornhill Club.
