= Signy Stefansson Eaton =

Canadian socialite, art collector and philanthropist

Signy Eaton
- Born: Signy Hildur Stefansson; July 1, 1913; Winnipeg, Manitoba, Canada
- Died: September 10, 1992 (aged 79); Toronto, Ontario, Canada
- Burial place: Mount Pleasant Cemetery
- Spouse: John David Eaton (m. 1933; died 1973)
- Children: John Craig Eaton II; Fredrik Stefan Eaton; Thor Edgar Eaton; George Ross Eaton

Signy Hildur Eaton (née Stefansson; July 1, 1913 – September 10, 1992) was a Canadian socialite, art collector and philanthropist. She was married to John David Eaton, of the Eaton family of Toronto.

== Biography ==
Signy Hildur Stefansson was born in Winnipeg, Manitoba, to Icelandic immigrants Fridrik Stefansson and Anna Olson. Her father emigrated from Iceland in 1876 and settled in New Iceland, Manitoba. He was a publisher and part-owner of Lögberg, an Icelandic language newspaper. Her maternal grandfather was a member of the Alþingi.

While studying art at the University of Manitoba and working as a receptionist at a dentist's office, she met John David Eaton, grandson of Timothy Eaton, founder of the eponymous T. Eaton Company Limited, who was working at the iconic store on Portage Avenue. Her future mother-in-law, Lady Eaton, a noted society doyenne, organized a reception to introduce Signy to Toronto society at Ardwold, the family's Toronto home. In 1933, Lady Eaton presented her to King George V and Queen Mary at Buckingham Palace.

Signy and John David were married on August 9, 1933, at Kawandag (now Rosseau Lake College), the Eaton family home on Lake Rosseau. The Union Flag and Icelandic flag were flown, Icelandic songs were sung and the bride wore a "Viking headress". Signy and John David had four sons; John Craig Eaton II (born 1937), Fredrik Stefan Eaton (1938–2021), Thor Edgar Eaton (1942–2017) and George Ross Eaton (born 1945).

As Mrs. John David Eaton, Signy was active in Toronto society. In 1937, the Eatons built a Bauhaus style residence designed by Alvan "Shy" Mathers and Eric Haldenby at 120 Dunvegan Road in the Toronto neighbourhood of Forest Hill. The Toronto Telegram named her one of the best dressed women in Toronto. Signy filled their Forest Hill home with works by Pablo Picasso, Maurice Utrillo, Raoul Dufy, Thelma van Alstyne, Marc Chagall, Georges Rouault, Jean-Paul Riopelle and Roloff Beny. In November 1967, their home was burgaled and $250,000 in art was stolen. They had other homes in Muskoka, Caledon, Antigua and Palm Beach. She was active in many philanthropic causes particularly the Art Gallery of Ontario, Royal Ontario Museum and the Hospital for Sick Children.

In 1959, in recognition of her philanthropy and interest in her ancestry, the Icelandic government named her a Knight of the Order of the Falcon, Iceland's only order of chivalry. She was appointed to the board of governors of York University when it opened in 1961 and received an Honorary Doctorate of Letters from the university in 1971.

Signy died of a stroke in Toronto on September 10, 1992, at the age of 79. Her funeral was held on September 15, 1992, at Timothy Eaton Memorial Church. She was interred in the Eaton family mausoleum at Mount Pleasant Cemetery. Her vast art collection was divided among her four sons and some pieces were sold at Sotheby's in 1994 and 1995.

She was the aunt of Helga Stephenson, a film industry executive who has held leadership roles with the Toronto International Film Festival and the Academy of Canadian Cinema and Television.
