= Orser =

Orser is a surname. Notable people with the surname include:

- Barbara Jayne Orser (born 1957), Canadian academic
- Brian Orser (born 1961), Canadian figure skater
- Earl Orser (1928–2004), Canadian businessman
- Leland Orser (born 1960/61), American actor

== See also ==
- Corser
