= Entrepreneurial feminism =

Theory

Entrepreneurial feminism, developed from social feminism, is a theory that explains how feminist values are enacted through the venture creation process to improve the position of women in society. Coined by Barbara Orser and Catherine Elliott, entrepreneurship is viewed as a mechanism to create economic self-sufficiency and equity-based outcomes for girls and women. Entrepreneurial feminists enter commercial markets to create wealth and social change, based on the ethics of cooperation, equality, and mutual respect.

Orser was further inspired to explore the relationship between gender and entrepreneurship after a number of scholars raised concerns over the "masculinization" of entrepreneurship, along with the publication of numerous studies demonstrating the effects of one's gender with respect to their self-image as an entrepreneur. As noted by Orser, the studies demonstrated that the entrepreneurial domain is dominated by a masculine discourse, and that the reinforcement of gendered stereotypes has led to the personification of the entrepreneur as a masculine entity.

Through their research and literature on the subject, Barbara Orser and Catherine Elliot aim to merge the studies of feminism and entrepreneurship, which have historically remained distinct areas of study and discourse. The majority of the existing research conducted by Orser, Elliot, and Leck aims to analyze how feminist values are enacted and manifested throughout the process of venture creation. Through their work, they aim to contribute to the literature by broadening the general understanding of entrepreneurial identity while simultaneously debunking the gendered constructs of entrepreneurship. In her research on "Feminist Attributes and Entrepreneurial Identity", Orser notes that "few studies have questioned the validity or applicability of a binary masculine/feminine nomenclature used to portray the entrepreneur".

In their studies of entrepreneurial feminism, Orser and Elliot employ a qualitative method of research, as they contend that it is particularly useful in order to derive the meaning of particular phenomena. This carries a particular significance given the lack of existing qualitative research on entrepreneurship in general, and even more so regarding female entrepreneurs. It is particularly important to conduct a qualitative study when you wish to understand the perspectives and manifestations of a subject's particular experiences in the workplace, which is exactly what Orser, Elliot and Leck aim to do through their expansion of the entrepreneurial feminist literature.

Orser defines entrepreneurial feminists as "change agents who seek to improve women's quality of life and well-being through innovative services, products and processes". Both Orser and Elliot recognize that this definition may seem to be at odds with the classical feminist criticism that capitalism itself is a source of women's subordination, however, they maintain that there is much in common between entrepreneurship and feminism.

== Modern connotations ==
Many women in the entrepreneurial field do not define themselves as entrepreneurs. This can be attributed to modesty and the patriarchy. Women are less likely than their male counterparts to take credit for business ideas and entrepreneurial feats. Additionally, the need for entrepreneurial feminism is further explained by systemic sexism in the business world. The gender pay gap and gaps in business education for women additionally are to blame for the difference in numbers of female entrepreneurs versus male ones. Studies in India have shown that incorporating feminist collaborative learning can help reach women in historically more oppressed geographical areas. Educating women about the field of entrepreneurship has led to an increase in female entrepreneurs. Technology has also allowed for a further reach, in India, Facebook was used as a tool for educating women on entering the entrepreneurial field of work.

== See also ==
- Feminist theory
- Feminine capital
