= Fredrik Stefan Eaton =

Canadian businessman (1938–2021)

Fredrik Stefan Eaton OC OOnt

Canadian High Commissioner to the United Kingdom
- In office 1991–1994
- Prime Minister: Brian Mulroney; Jean Chrétien
- Preceded by: Donald Stovel Macdonald
- Succeeded by: Royce Frith

Personal details
- Born: 26 June 1938 Toronto, Ontario
- Died: 20 February 2021 (aged 82) Caledon, Ontario
- Spouse: Catherine Howard Martin (m. 1962)
- Education: University of New Brunswick (BA '62)

Fredrik Stefan Eaton OC OOnt (26 June 1938 – 20 February 2021) was a Canadian businessman and philanthropist who was a member of the once-prominent Eaton family. He was the great-grandson of Eaton's department store founder Timothy Eaton.

== Life and career ==
He was born in Toronto to John David Eaton and his wife, Signy Hildur Stefansson, and he was raised in the Forest Hill area. His mother was of Icelandic descent. He had three brothers – John Craig Eaton, Thor Edgar Eaton and George Ross Eaton.

In 1962, Eaton received a Bachelor of Arts degree from the University of New Brunswick and started working as a salesman at Eaton's in British Columbia. From 1977 to 1988, he was the chairman, president and CEO of Eaton's.

Eaton served as Canadian High Commissioner to the United Kingdom from 1991 to 1994. In 1993, he was appointed Chancellor of the University of New Brunswick and served for two terms of five years.

He married Catherine "Nicky" Martin and had two children – Fredrik D'Arcy Eaton, who lives in Toronto and is head of the Catherine and Fredrik Eaton Charitable Foundation, and Flora Catherine Eaton Coakley, who lives in New York City.

Eaton lived with his family in Toronto, and he also had a country estate in Caledon, Ontario, a cottage on Georgian Bay, and a winter home in Florida. He was one of the most public members of the Eaton family, and he attended social events and endowed many institutions philanthropically.

== Honours ==
In 1990, Eaton was made an Officer of the Order of Canada for having "contributed to many aspects of Canadian life. Through his leadership in a variety of organizations, in fields as diverse as those of business, education, nature, health care and the arts, he continued his family's tradition of exemplary service to the public." In 2001, he was awarded the Order of Ontario for his "contributions in numerous areas including health care and the arts".
