= John David Eaton =

Canadian businessman (1909–1973)

- Born: 4 October 1909; Toronto, Ontario
- Died: 4 August 1973 (aged 63); Toronto, Ontario
- Resting place: Mount Pleasant Cemetery
- Education: Trinity College School; Stowe School; Corpus Christi College, Cambridge
- Spouse: Signy Stefansson (m. 1933)
- Children: John Craig Eaton II; Fredrik Stefan Eaton; Thor Edgar Eaton; George Ross Eaton
- Parent(s): Sir John Craig Eaton; Flora McCrae
- Family: Eaton family

John David Eaton (4 October 1909 – 4 August 1973) was a Canadian businessman and a member of the Eaton family. From 1942–1969, he was president of Eaton's, the department store chain his grandfather, Timothy Eaton, founded.

== Early life and education ==
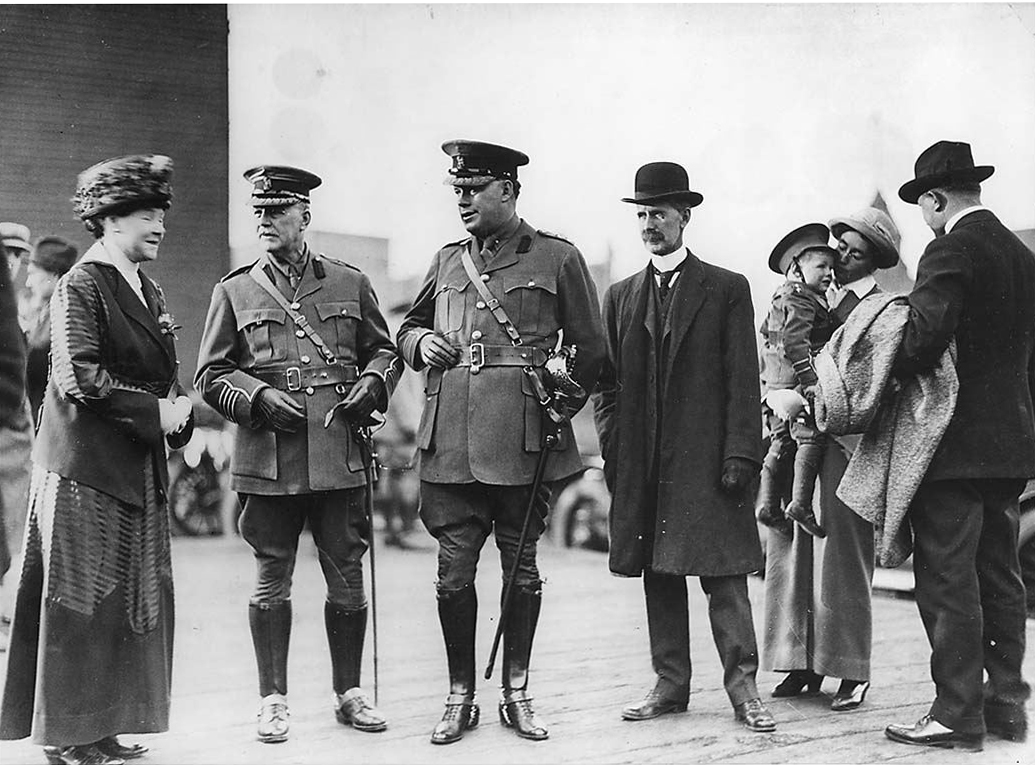
Eaton, third from right in the arms of his nurse, with his father, Sir John Craig Eaton, centre, visiting the Eaton Machine Gun Battery, 1915

Eaton was born in Toronto on 4 October 1909. He was the second son of Sir John Craig Eaton and Flora McCrae. His paternal grandfather, Timothy Eaton, had founded the T. Eaton Company Limited, commonly known as Eaton's, in 1869. Eaton grew up in Toronto at Ardwold, his parents' palatial home overlooking the city. His mother, Lady Eaton, was a Toronto society matron and hosted many major functions at Ardwold.

Sir John Craig Eaton died of pneumonia in 1922 at the age of 45. Since none of his children were old enough to take over the presidency of Eaton's at his death, his cousin, Robert Young Eaton, assumed the role. Sir John Craig's will stipulated that his successor was to be chosen by the board of directors from his four sons once they had all come of age and one could distinguish himself. John David had proved himself the most worthy candidate from a young age and was unanimously chosen in 1942.

Eaton was educated at Trinity College School in Port Hope, Ontario, and Stowe School in Buckinghamshire, England. He matriculated to Corpus Christi College, Cambridge, where he studied foreign languages. He did not graduate, instead returning to Canada to begin working for Eaton's, in the Queen Street store in Toronto and the store in Winnipeg.

== Career ==
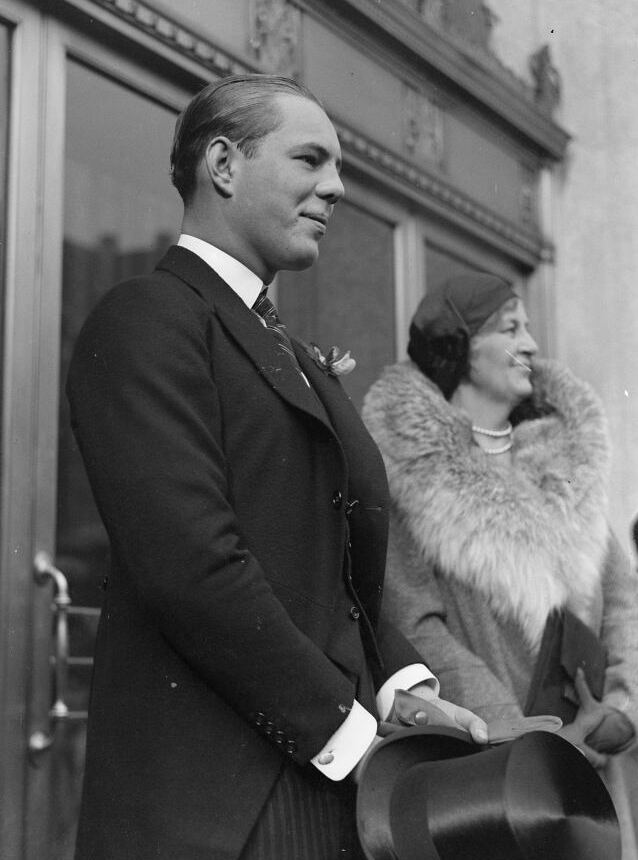
Eaton and his mother at the opening of Eaton's College Street, 1930

Eaton became a director at Eaton's in 1934, overseeing its expansion in Northern Ontario, before being appointed director of the manufacturing head office in 1936 and elected vice-president of the company in 1937. On 9 December 1942, Robert Young Eaton resigned the presidency and was succeeded by 33-year-old John David.

As president, John David oversaw Eaton's expansion further west, acquiring Spencer's in British Columbia in 1948. The store also expanded beyond its traditional downtown locations and began opening in suburban shopping centres during his tenure. Eaton's also began partnering in the construction of shopping centres in downtown cores, many of which bore the name Eaton Centre. Many of these shopping centres failed and Eaton considered this his greatest failure as president. He implemented an employee welfare plan with life insurance, an employee discount and a vacation policy, as well as the Eaton Retirement Annuity Plan for his employees, which he donated $50 million of his personal fortune to start.

Eaton, suffering from arthritis, retired as president in August 1969 at the age of 60. He was succeeded by Robert Butler, the first non-Eaton to hold the position. Two of his four sons eventually held the position and oversaw the store's bankruptcy in 1999.

== Personal life and death ==
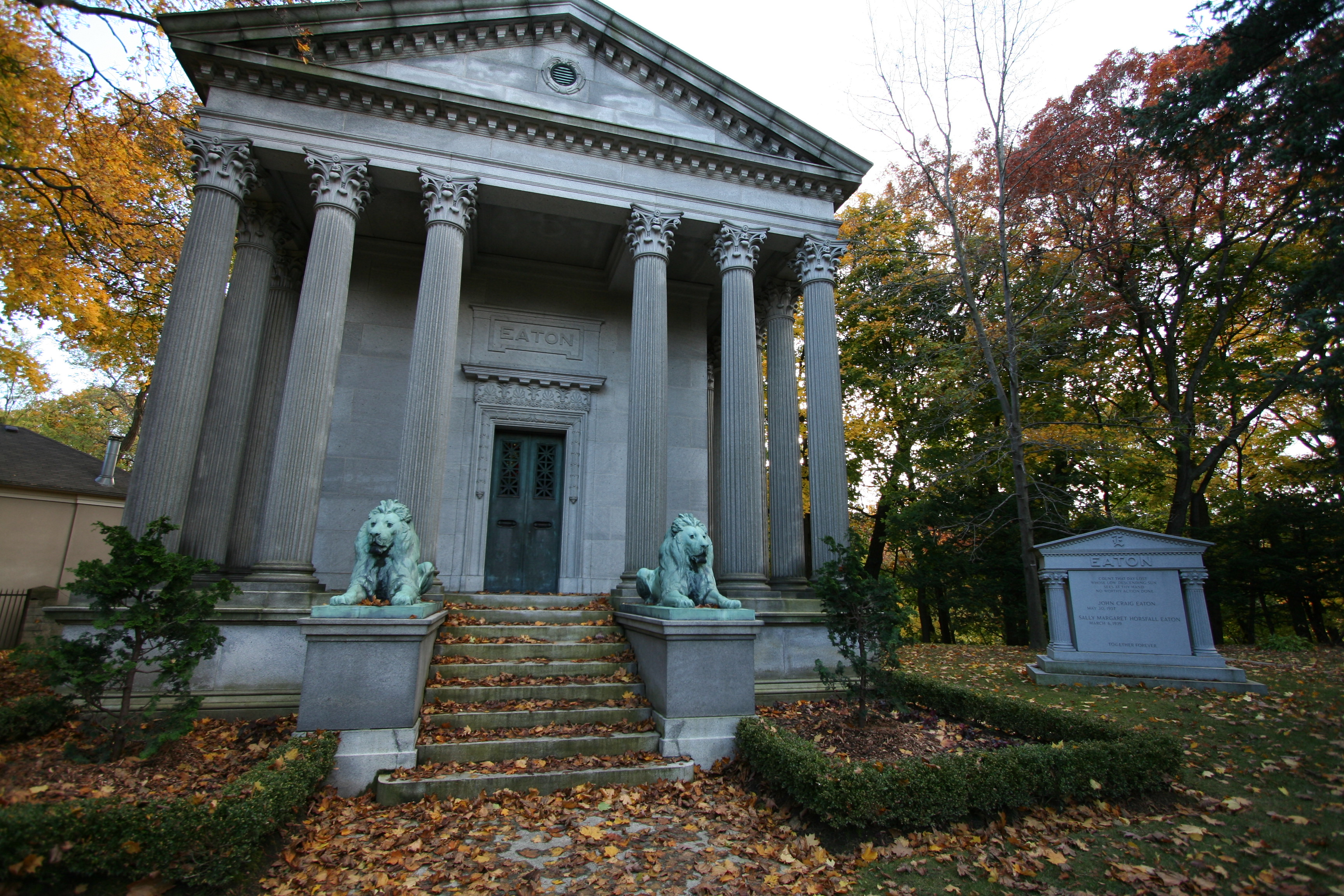
The Eaton Mausoleum, 2010

On 9 August 1933, Eaton married Signy Stefansson at Kawandag, his family home on Lake Rosseau. He met Signy in Winnipeg while she was a student at the University of Manitoba and he was working at the Eaton's Portage Avenue store. They had four sons: John Craig Eaton II (born 1937); Fredrik Stefan Eaton (1938–2021); Thor Edgar Eaton (1942–2017); and George Ross Eaton (born 1945).

Despite being one of the wealthiest people in Canada, Eaton was a shy man who shunned publicity. He was a Freemason, belonging to Assiniboine Lodge No. 114 based in Winnipeg.

Plagued with ill health throughout his later career and retirement, Eaton died aged 63 from pneumonia on 4 August 1973 at home in Toronto. He was interred in the Eaton Mausoleum at Mount Pleasant Cemetery.

== Bibliography ==
- Kopytek, Bruce Allen (2014). Eaton's: The Trans-Canada Store. Cheltenham: The History Press.
- McQueen, Rod (1999). The Eatons: The Rise and Fall of Canada's Royal Family. Toronto: Stoddart.
