= Feminine Capital =

2015 book by Orser and Elliott

- First edition
- Author: Barbara J. Orser; Catherine J. Elliott
- Language: English
- Genre: Non-fiction
- Publisher: Standord Business Books
- Publication date: 2015
- Publication place: United States
- ISBN: 978-0-804-78378-1

Feminine Capital: Unlocking the Power of Women Entrepreneurs is a non-fiction book written by Barbara J. Orser and Catherine J. Elliott. The book provides insight into how the intersection between entrepreneurship and feminism is evolving. The authors situate women’s entrepreneurship within the broader contexts of economics and feminism, and considers how sex role stereotypes have led to entrepreneurial characteristics that are predominantly masculine.

Orser and Elliott challenge these stereotypes, asserting that women's approaches to entrepreneurship are diverse and multi-faceted. The authors describe hurdles that women overcome to change people's perceptions and obtain the resources they need and how some women business owners improve women and girls’ quality of life and well-being through their entrepreneurial actions. They coin the phenomena entrepreneurial feminism. Predicated on social relationships and utilitarian outcomes, case studies illustrate how women are collaborating to create ‘by women, for women’ ventures.’ A gendered matrix of venture creation is advanced. The stories and scenarios explain the concepts and theories that are found in each chapter. The book closes with an overview of gender-based analysis of policies and programs to support women entrepreneurs.
