= 10 Armoury Street =

Courthouse site in Toronto, Canada

Coordinates: 43.6541°N 79.3861°W

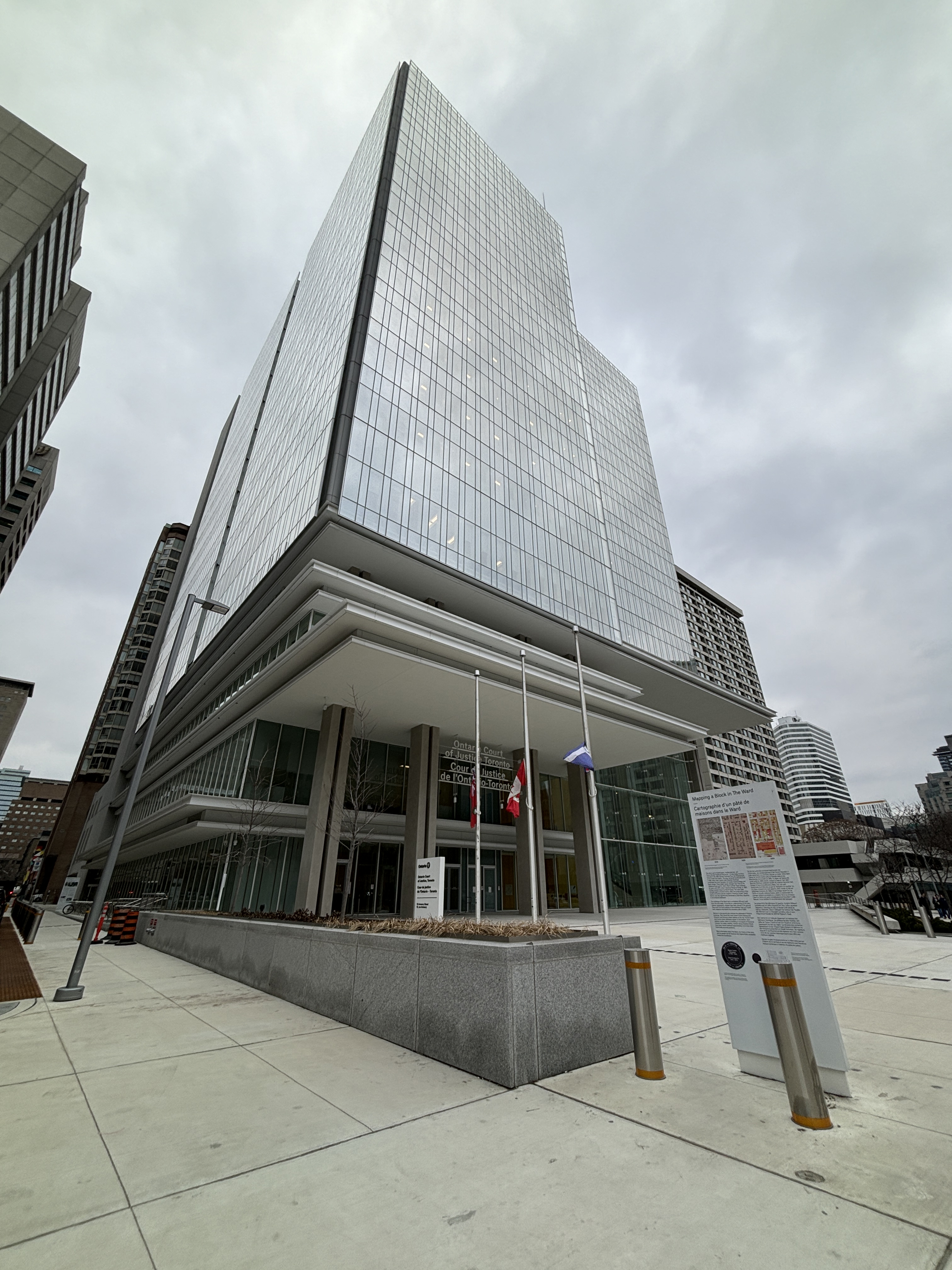
10 Armoury St

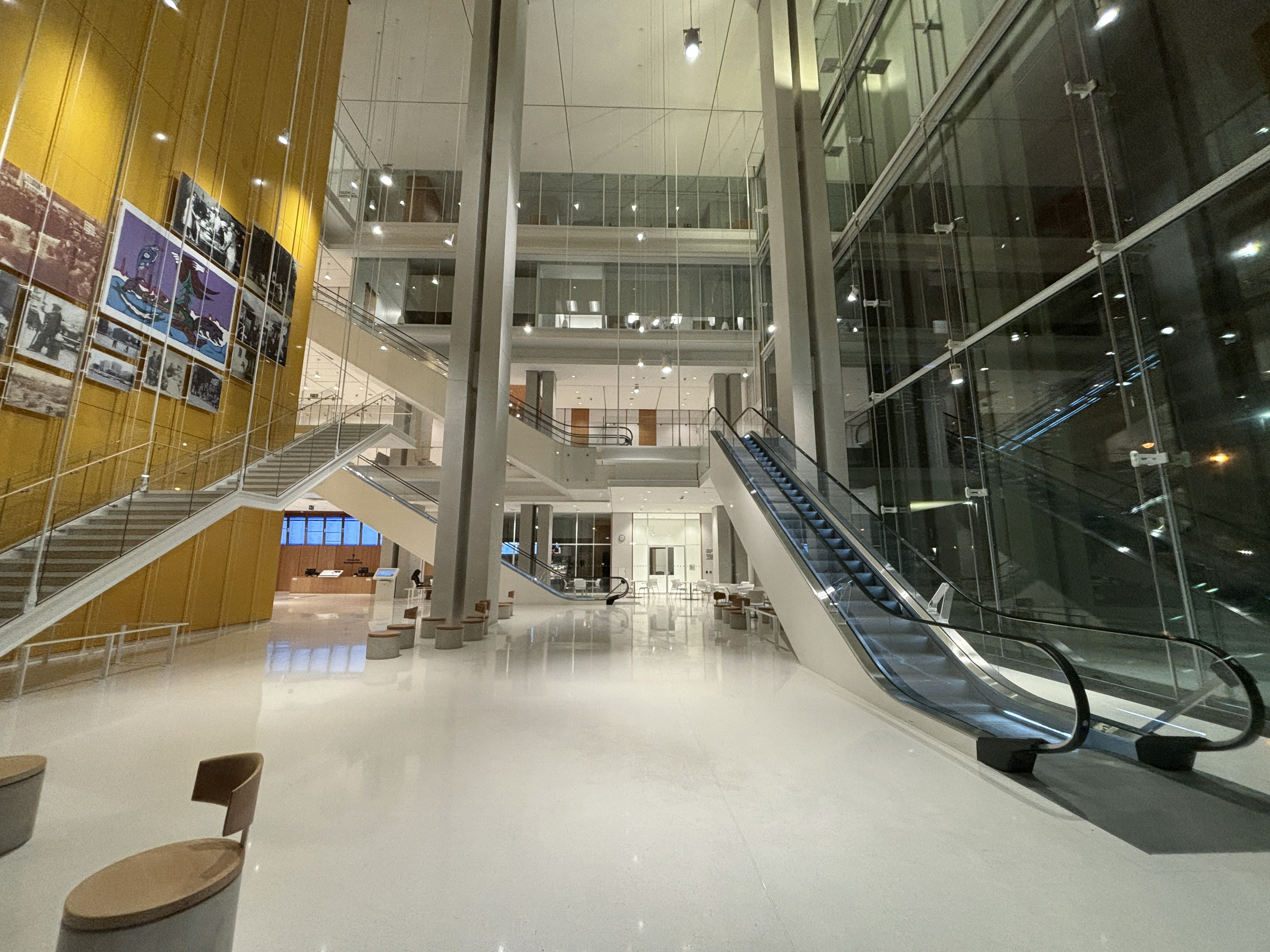
Court Lobby

10 Armoury Street in Toronto, Ontario, Canada, is the site of a new courthouse that opened in 2023, consolidating six Ontario Court of Justice criminal courts, 73 judicial hearing rooms, and other court services in one location. The 17-story, 775,000-square-foot tower is the largest courthouse in Ontario. The courthouse replaces previous court facilities in Toronto, including those formerly at Old City Hall, College Park, 2201 Finch Avenue West (which remains as an adult bail centre), 1000 Finch Avenue West, 1911 Eglinton Avenue East, and 311 Jarvis Street.

The new complex, which is located just north of Toronto City Hall, cost an estimated $956 million to build. Renzo Piano Building Workshop was the architect.
