= Robert Young Eaton =

Canadian businessman (1875–1956)

- Born: 11 July 1875; Killyree, County Antrim
- Died: 28 July 1956 (aged 81); Toronto, Ontario
- Spouse: Hazel Margaret Ireland (m. 1911)

Robert Young Eaton (11 July 1875 – 28 July 1956) was a Canadian businessman and a member of the prominent Eaton family. A nephew of Timothy Eaton, who established Eaton's department store chain, he served as the company's president.

== Life and career ==
He was born in 1875 to John Eaton and his wife, Margaret Herbison. He was related to the founder of Eaton's department store, as they shared the same grandfather, John Eaton Sr. (1784–1834).

He took over control of the Eaton's store business after his cousin, Sir John Craig Eaton, died of pneumonia in 1922. Sir John's children were too young to run the company, so he filled in until one of the children reached an appropriate age to take over. He proved to be an extremely capable president, and he expanded the company tenfold.

His cousin-in-law, Lady Eaton, the widow of Sir John, never liked him. Throughout her life, she always referred to her branch of the family as the "owner Eatons" and his branch as the "worker Eatons". Lady Eaton's son, John David Eaton, eventually took over the presidency of the company at the age of 33, and R.Y. Eaton retired from business life.

He had a resort home named Ireton built in Port Credit, Ontario, and later in Georgian Bay. He also served as president of the Art Gallery of Ontario from 1924 to 1941.

== Marriage and children ==
He married Hazel Ireland (1889–1965), and they had 5 children. His son John Wallace Eaton (1912–1990) worked at Eaton's and ran the Montreal store.

His son Captain Erskine Robert Eaton (1915–1942) graduated from the Royal Military College of Canada in 1934. At the outbreak of World War II, he was a member of the staff at Eaton's Montreal store. He died in the Dieppe Raid on August 19, 1942, at 27 years of age. His name is listed on the Memorial Arch at the Royal Military College of Canada. Robert Young Eaton's daughter, Colonel Margaret Craig Eaton (1912-1988), was “appointed national adjutant of the uniformed Red Cross in 1941” (McQueen 89) and was later recruited to the Canadian Women’s Army Corps (CWAC). In 1944, she was appointed CWAC Director General and became the first in the Corps to achieve the rank of Colonel. Colonel Eaton received the Order of the British Empire (OBE) for her wartime service. She retired from the Corps in 1945, when she married John Hubert Dunn. She died in England in 1988. Sources for Margaret Eaton biographical information:

McQueen, Robert. The Eatons: The Rise and Fall of Canada's Royal Family. Toronto: Stoddart, 1998.

Conrod, Hugh. Athene: The Canadian Women's Army Corps Their Story. Wm. McNabb & Son: Halifax, N.S., 1983.
