= Corser =

Surname

Corser is a surname, and may refer to:

- Bernard Corser, (1882–1967) Australian politician
- Edward Corser, (1852–1928) Australian politician
- Frederick Corser, (1849–1924) American architect
- John B. Corser (died 2000), American politician
- Rodger Corser, (born 1973) Australian actor
- Thomas Corser, (1793–1876) British clergyman
- Troy Corser, (born 1971) Australian motorcycle racer
