= College Park (Toronto) =

Complex in Toronto, Ontario, Canada

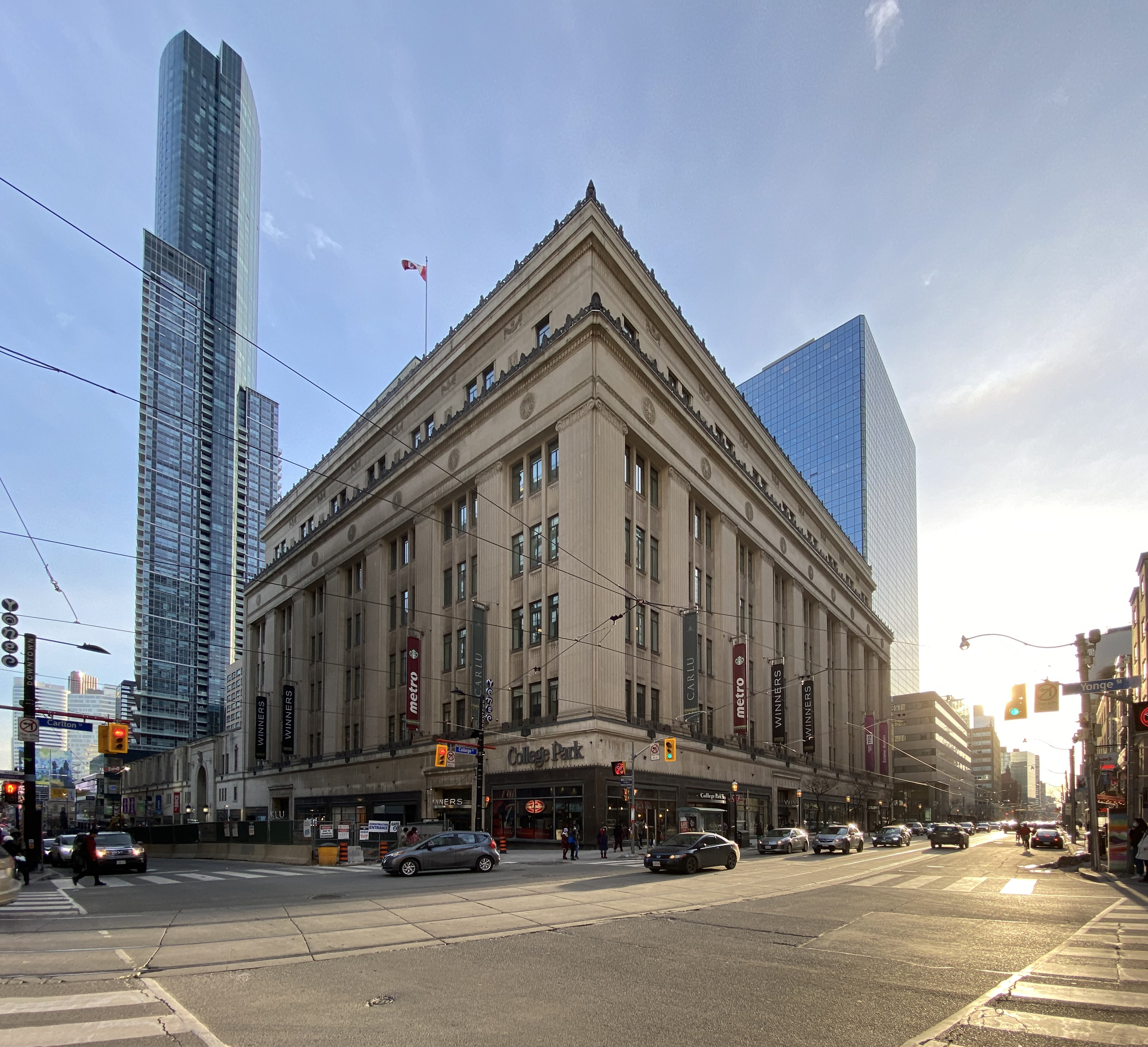
College Park from the northeast corner of College and Yonge Street, 2022

College Park is a shopping mall, residential and office complex on the southwest corner of Yonge and College streets in Toronto, Ontario, Canada.

An Art Deco landmark, the building was initially known as Eaton's College Street. It was operated by Eaton's from 1930 to 1977. After being sold to new owners and adapted for new purposes, it was renamed as College Park.

== Architecture ==
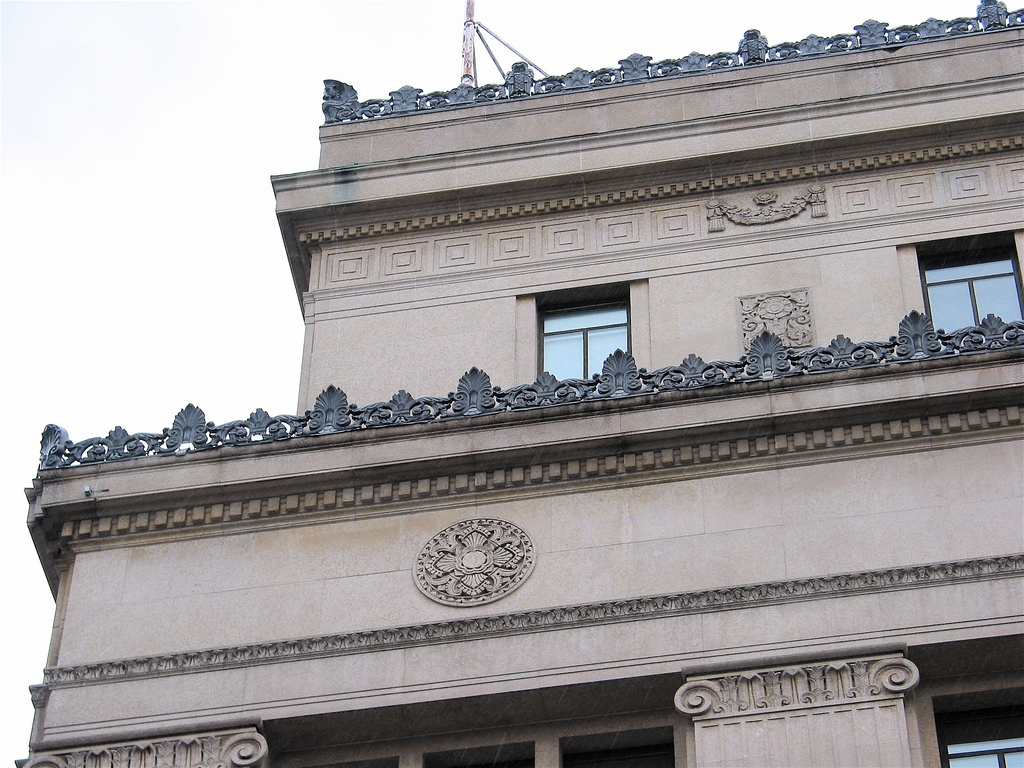
Tyndall limestone was used for the exterior of the building.

College Park was built for Eaton between 1928 and 1930, and was designed by Ross and Macdonald (in association with Henry Sproatt). The Montreal architectural firm was known for also designing the Royal York Hotel and Maple Leaf Gardens in Toronto, the Château Laurier Hotel in Ottawa, and the Montreal Eaton's store. Although the rest of a planned complex was not constructed, because of the Great Depression, the new Eaton store was considered a retail palace, the likes of which had never been seen in Toronto. It expressed the retail dominance of the Eaton's chain at that time. Tyndall limestone was used for the imposing exterior. Accentuating the Tyndall limestone was granite and a corrosion-resistant alloy of nickel and copper called monel metal. The monel metal was used copiously on the building as trim and in panels along the window and door frames. In addition to this metal trim, cast stone and carvings were created for detailed decorative elements on the façade.

Marble was imported from Europe for the interior columns and colonnade. Lady Eaton arranged for two entire rooms to be removed from two manor houses in England and reassembled in the furniture department of the College Street store. The French architect Jacques Carlu (who later designed the Rainbow Room in New York City and Eaton's Ninth Floor (or the "9ième") in Montreal), was retained to design the interior of the Eaton's Seventh Floor, including the 1300-seat Eaton Auditorium and the elegant Round Room restaurant. The Eaton's Seventh Floor, considered an Art Moderne masterpiece, was at the heart of Toronto's cultural life for many years. The Auditorium hosted major performers of its day, including Billie Holiday, Duke Ellington, Frank Sinatra, and the National Ballet of Canada. The noted Canadian pianist Glenn Gould, fond of the Auditorium's excellent acoustics, made a number of his recordings of music in this hall.

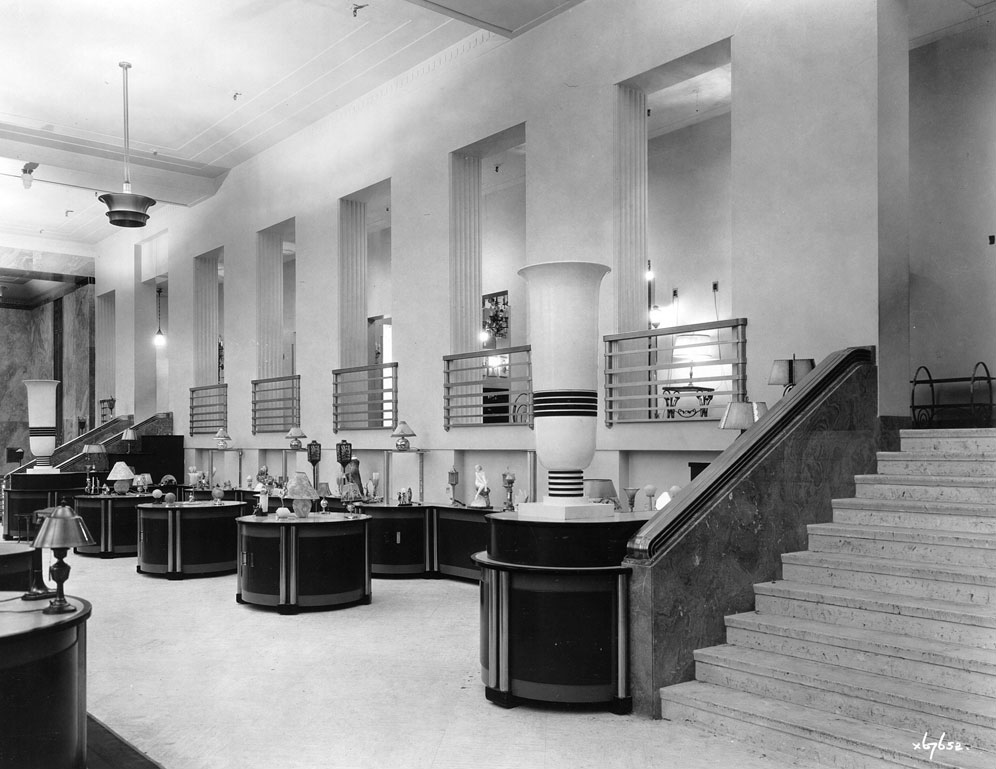
The original layout of Eaton's College Street was classified as a stripped Art Deco style, that emphasized a symmetrical design.

Classified specifically as a stripped classical art deco style, Eaton's College Street emphasized symmetry in the plan and rhythm in the arrangement of the fenestration, doors, and pilasters. A distinct repetitive pattern can be distinguished with the windows and pilasters, as well as with the arrangement of large entrances.

Three small windows are on the upper levels between each pilaster, and three large shop windows between each entrance. The original Eaton's College Street was designed with large shop windows on the floor level to attract window shoppers and pedestrians. The floor level has a large, distinctive base, another classical art deco characteristic. In addition to the oversized windows of the floor level, the base was made more prominent through the use of the granite and stone carvings framing it. On higher levels, the fenestration became long vertical strips separated by large pilasters, which highlighted the verticality of the structure as opposed to its mass (another distinguishing feature of art deco buildings).

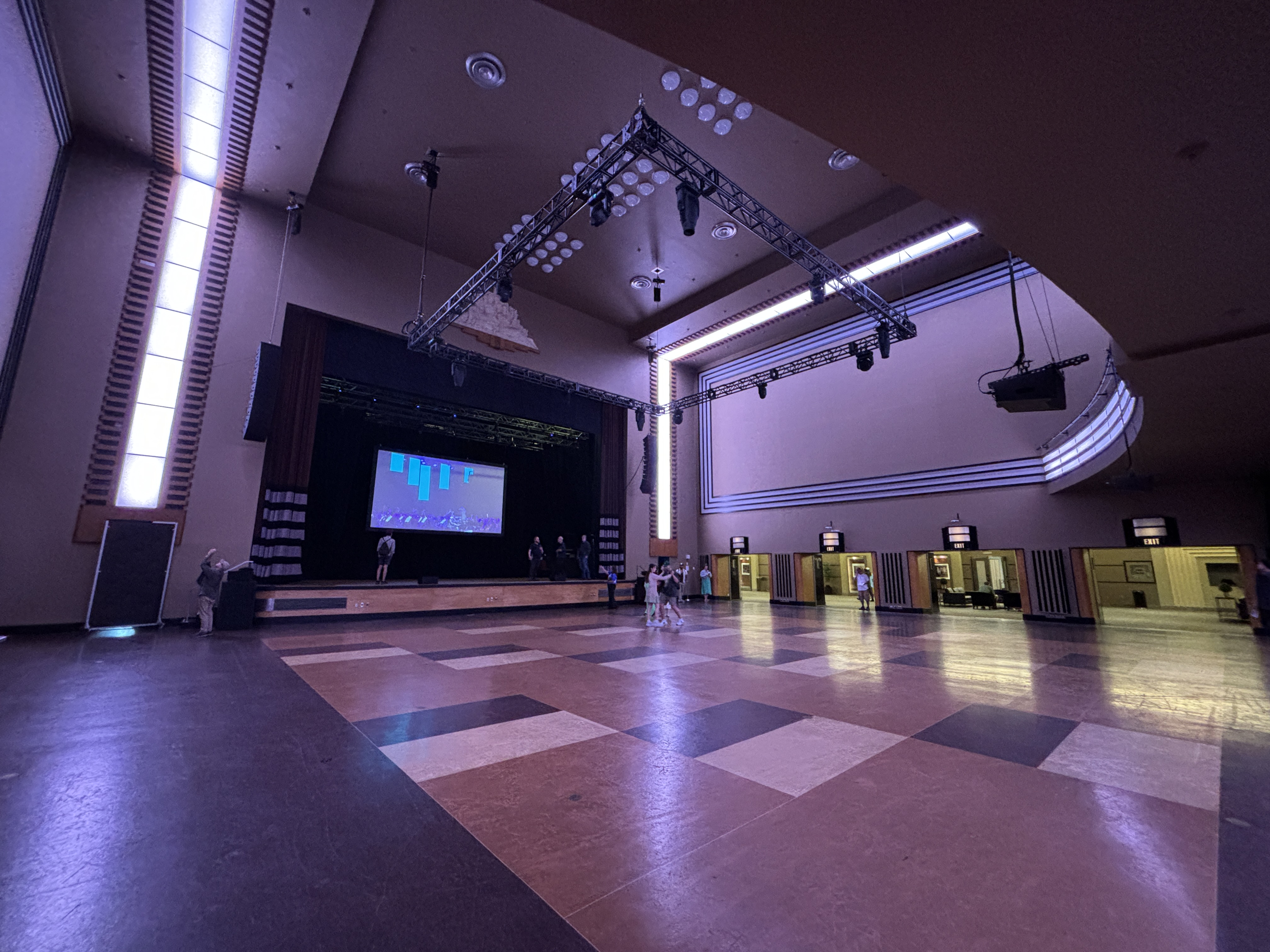
The Carlu Auditorium

The pilasters of the upper levels have fluting and capitals of ionic composition and support a rather large entablature. Art Deco architecture, well known for its geometric patterns and ornamentation, is demonstrated in the detailed entablature, with a sculpted architrave, dentils on the cornice, and a monel metal trim along the top. Along the frieze are round ornamental metal pieces placed in a rhythmic order between the pilasters. Each entrance is flanked by a slightly protruding cast stone frame decorated with sculpted square shapes, and dentils, and bordered by a spiral, ribbon-shaped cast stone. The monel metal trim on the window frames represents the art deco style of having natural shapes such as flowers or sunbursts, as influenced from the Egyptian and Mayan styles (New York Architecture). As can be observed, the trim is a natural organic shape.

These features are present only on the Yonge and College street frontages. The back of the building, facing the park, while maintaining a rather symmetrical and repetitive fenestration pattern, is sparse on decoration. Entrances have been kept rather nondescript.

== History ==
Eaton's began secretly assembling land at Yonge and College streets in 1910 for a new store. The First World War put the company's development plans on hold, but Eaton's retained the land. During the 1920s, Eaton's planned to shift all their operations from their existing location at Yonge Street and Queen Street West to the College Street site. Eaton's offered to sell part of its landholdings to its main competitor, Simpson's, in an effort to shift the heart of Toronto retailing northward and to preserve the synergy created by having two retail giants next to one another. They did not succeed, and Simpson's chose instead to expand its Queen Street store.

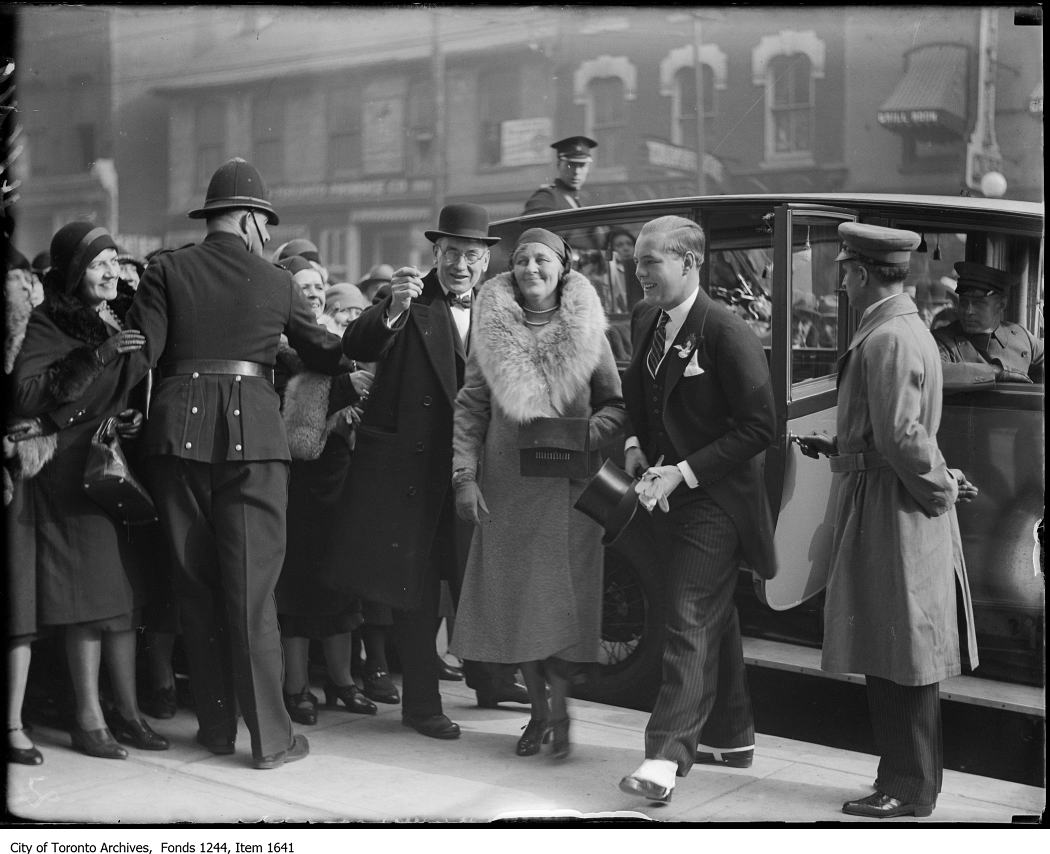
Flora Eaton and her son, John David Eaton, attending the opening of Eaton's College Street, October 1930.

In 1928, Eaton's announced plans for the largest retail and office complex in the world to be constructed on the site, featuring 5,000,000 square feet (465,000 square metres) of retail space and a 38-storey, 1920s-era skyscraper. Just as the war had intervened a decade earlier, however, the Great Depression curtailed their full plans for the site. The first phase of the project, a department store of 600,000 square feet (56,000 square metres), was the only part of the complex that was built. But, the planned foundation pillars, 10 feet in diameter, were driven 30 feet down into bedrock during the construction of the first phase to accommodate the planned tower. Bones of large pre-historic mammals, either mammoth or mastodon, were uncovered during the digging for the foundation. On October 30, 1930, the new store was opened by Lady Eaton, the matriarch of the Eaton family, and her son John David Eaton, the future president of the company.

Eaton's College Street, as the store was known, focused on the sale of furnishings and housewares, although the latter were very broadly defined. Eaton's boasted that the store was "the largest furniture and house furnishings store in the British Empire". The larger Eaton's Main Store, a few blocks south on Yonge Street, was never closed, as had been intended in the 1920s plan. Eaton's ran a shuttle bus between the two stores for two decades until the Toronto subway opened in 1954.

=== Post-Eaton's ownership ===
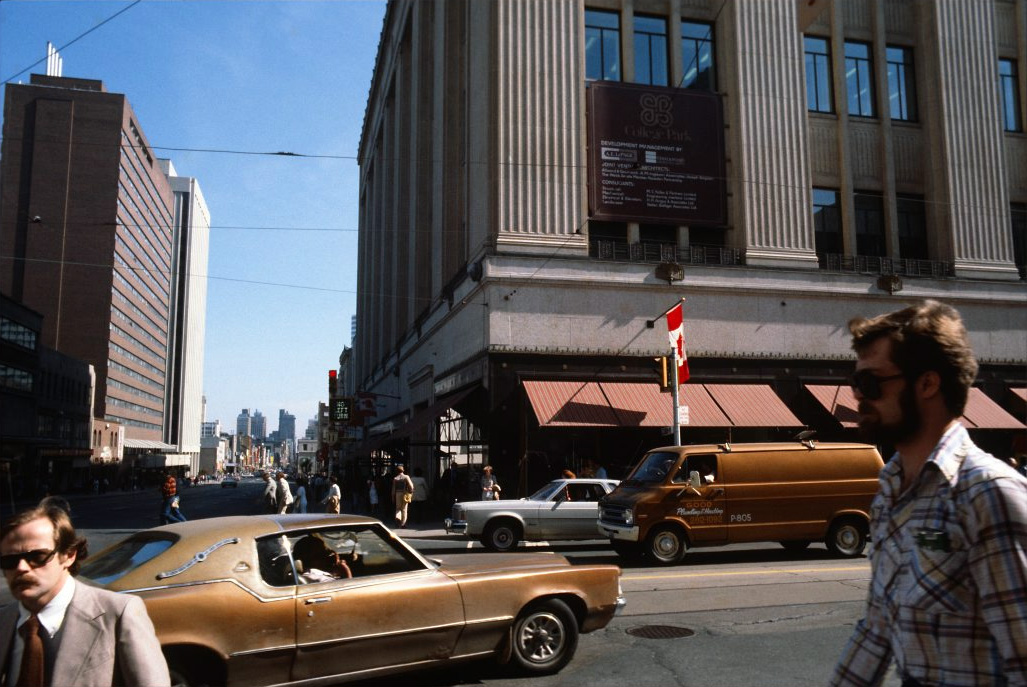
College Park in 1979. A sign on the building informing pedestrians of redevelopment works in the building.

With the opening of the Toronto Eaton Centre in 1977, the Eaton's Main Store and Eaton's College Street were both closed in favour of the new Eaton's flagship store at Yonge and Dundas streets. The College Street store was spared the fate of the former Main Store, which was demolished to make way for the second phase of the Eaton Centre construction.

The College Street building was sold to new owners, who renamed it as College Park after adapting it for different uses. The lower floors of the store were converted to a shopping mall of small, high-end boutiques and a subway concourse (with the marble and Art Deco stylings of the Eaton's store carefully preserved), and the upper floors were converted to office space.

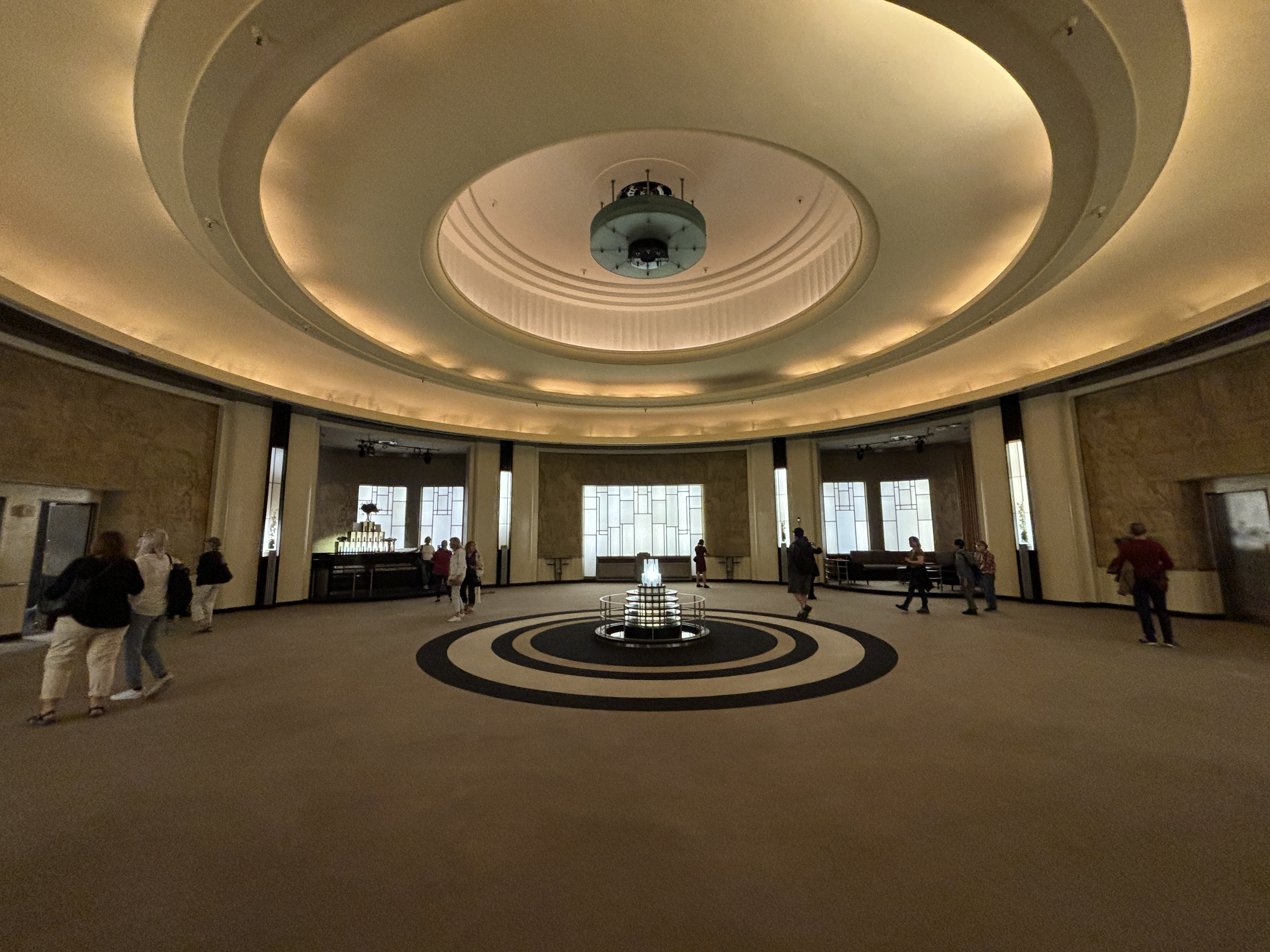
After restoration work was completed, the floor reopened as The Carlu event venue in 2003.

Although the new owners had originally agreed to preserve the Seventh Floor, they eventually determined that its preservation and restoration was not financially feasible. They applied for a demolition permit to convert the entire floor to office accommodation. After a lengthy court battle with the City of Toronto, the Court of Appeal for Ontario ruled in 1986 that the 1975 designation of the building under the Ontario Heritage Act protected the Seventh Floor from demolition. Despite several changes in building ownership, and the efforts of local heritage advocates, the Seventh Floor was sealed off for many years and allowed to deteriorate. Although it was protected by law, owners had no legal obligation to use or restore it. After an extensive renovation program to restore the original art deco architecture, the space reopened in 2003 as The Carlu, an event and convention venue.

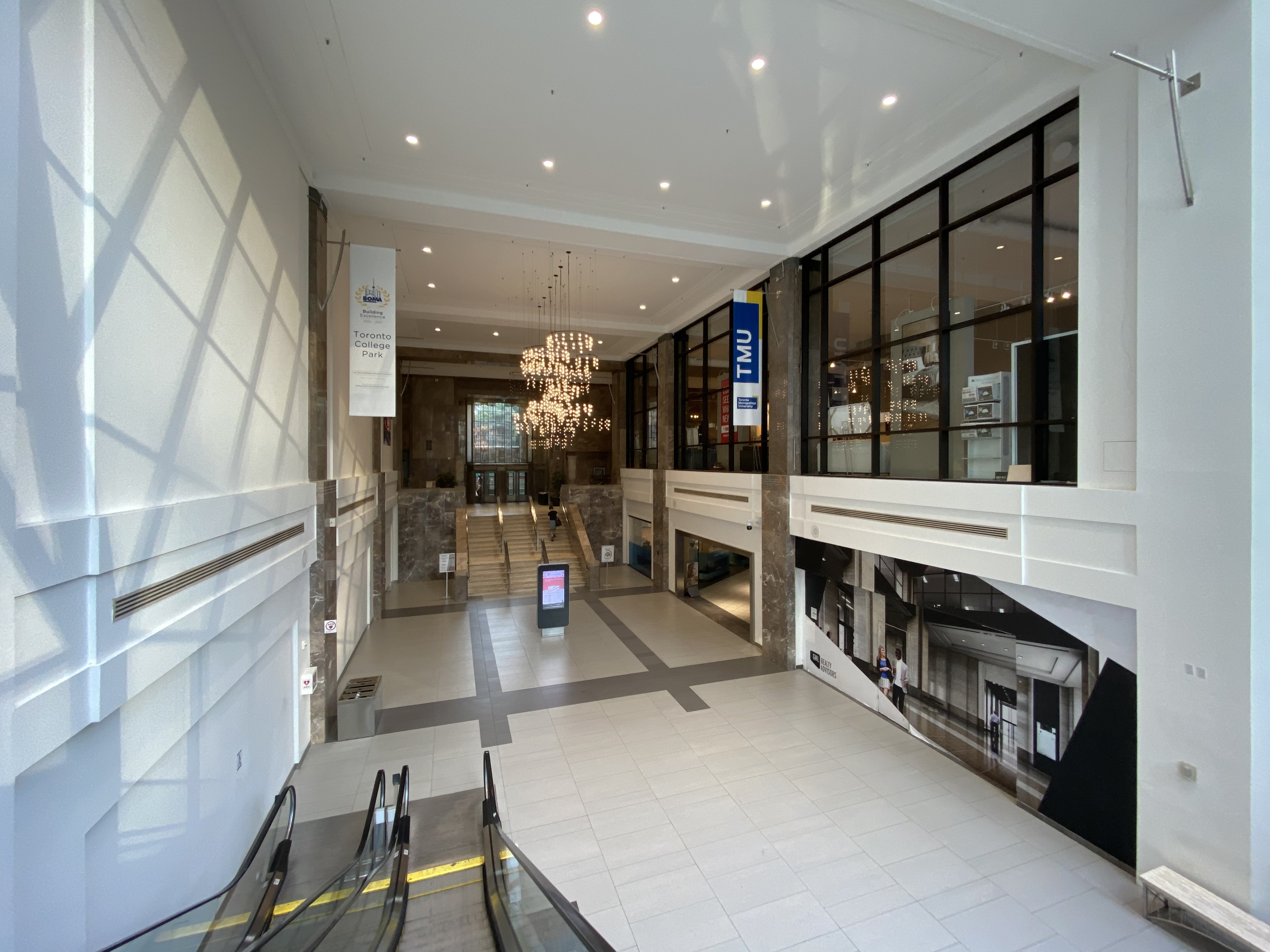
Retail atrium in College Park

Over time, College Park was expanded through the addition of a residential apartment building in 1978 and a 30-storey glass and steel office building in 1984 (which housed the offices of the Maclean-Hunter media empire). Although neither addition was architecturally sympathetic to the original building, the heritage and architectural integrity of the former Eaton's store was preserved. The former Maclean-Hunter now houses offices of several government of Ontario ministries. The retail levels have two grocery stores (Metro and Farm Boy), Winners store, a food court, Planet Fitness and clicnic.

== College Park Courthouse ==
From 1979 until 2023, the second floor of College Park, with an entrance at 777 Yonge Street, housed a courthouse dealing with criminal matters from police divisions east of Yonge Street (divisions 51, 53, 54 and 55) and adult female bail court for the city of Toronto. In 2023, the courts moved to a new facility at 10 Armoury Street.

== College Park – Barbara Ann Scott Ice Trail ==
College Park Barbara Ann Scott Ice Trail
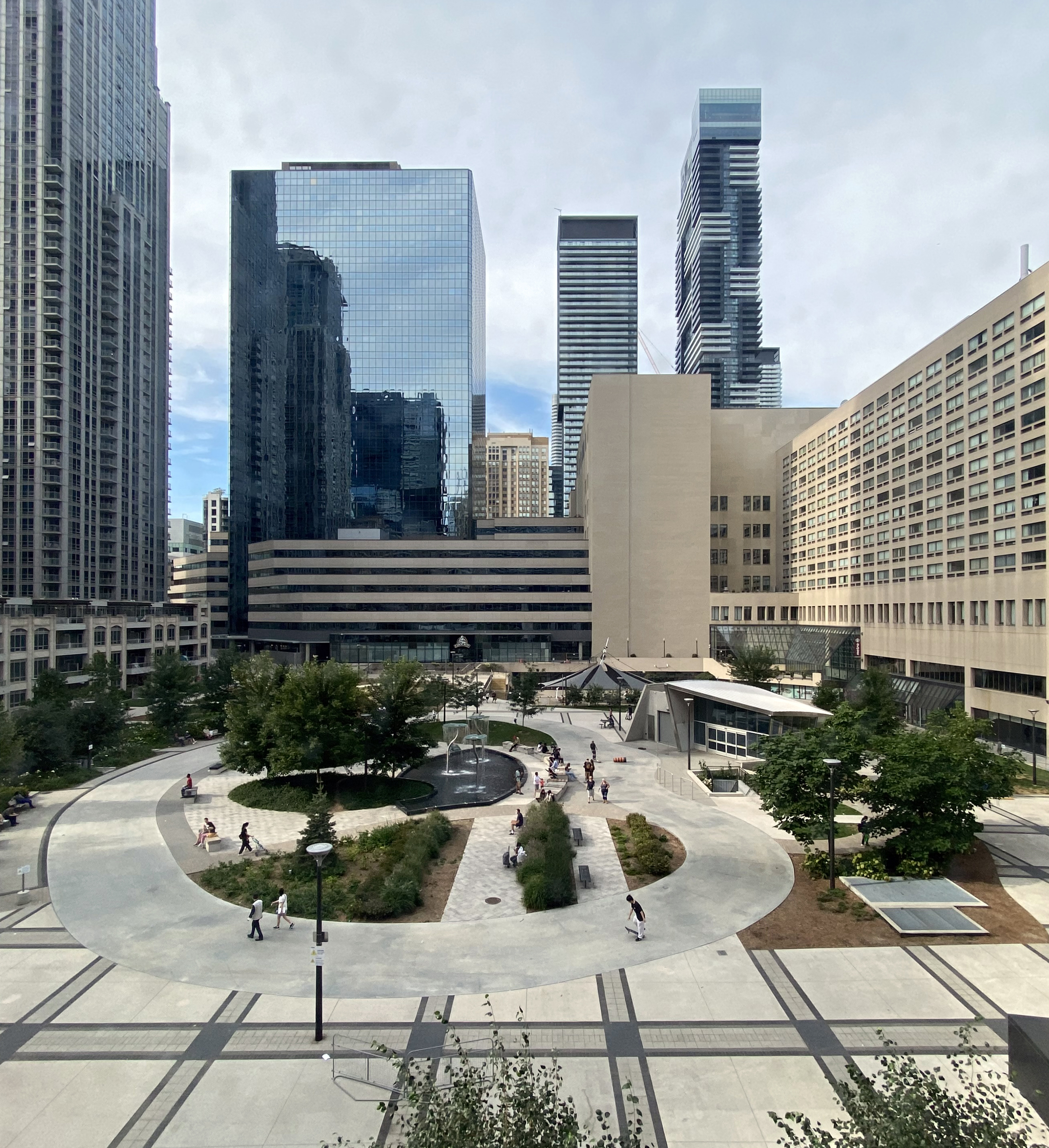
- Interactive map of College Park; Barbara Ann Scott Ice Trail
- Location: 420 Yonge Street
- Coordinates: 43°39′35″N 79°23′2″W
- Website: Park

College Park (the park rather than the building) is a 0.75 hectares (1.9 acres) greenspace located behind the buildings in the block bordered by Yonge, College, Bay and Gerrard streets. It is the second largest park in downtown Toronto after Allan Gardens. It was built in the 1980s over an underground garage. The park was closed for renovations in early 2016 and reopened in 2019. Today, the park contains the Barbara Ann Scott Ice Trail.

Originally, the park's official name was Barbara Ann Scott Park, named after 1948 Olympic champion figure skater Barbara Ann Scott. But, informally, the greenspace was commonly referred to as College Park, a habit carried over in marketing the newer Aura condominium complex (at Yonge and Gerrard streets, north-west corner) as "Aura at College Park". Prior to its closure for renovation in 2016, the park had a skating pavilion standing by the Barbara Anne Scott rink. The renovation was financed by $3 million in development fees from the Aura's builder, plus additional funds from the City and the Downtown Yonge Business Improvement Area. The architects were RAW Design and MBTW Group/Watchorn Architect.

After renovation, the park was officially re-opened on July 10, 2019, as "College Park". A central feature of the revitalized park is the five-metre-wide skating trail named the Barbara Ann Scott Ice Trail. The original skating rink and pavilion are gone. Today there is a 5-metre wide circular path that becomes the ice trail in winter. Next to the trail is a new warming pavilion with a rubber floor for skates; it also houses washrooms and provides storage for a Zamboni machine. The park also features a water fountain, sculptures, plants, seating and a children's playground.
