= Thelma van Alstyne =

Canadian artist (1913-2008)

Thelma Van Alstyne
- Born: Thelma Selina Scribbans; 1913; Victoria, British Columbia
- Died: 2008; Port Hope, Ontario
- Education: Vancouver School of Art
- Known for: Painter
- Movement: Abstract art
- Elected: Royal Canadian Academy of Arts (1977)

Thelma Van Alstyne RCA (born 1913 as Thelma Selina Scribbans) was a Canadian artist elected to the Royal Canadian Academy of Arts in 1977.

== Life and career ==
Van Alstyne was born in Victoria, British Columbia. Although she studied at the Vancouver School of Art, she is mostly self-taught. She worked as a secretary before becoming an artist. After moving to Toronto, Ontario, she became more active in the arts scene. She created abstract art among other types, often using watercolour and pastel, or oil paint as her mediums.

Beyond art, van Alsytne was deeply spiritual (embracing Buddhism and Christianity), and practised and taught Tai chi.

Van Alstyne died in Port Hope, Ontario, on August 24, 2008.

=== Work ===
Van Alstyne's work is held by the Art Museum at the University of Toronto.

Since her death, several of van Alstyne's works have been sold at auctions.

Queen's University Archives has a folder of text materials archived, and the Toronto Public Library has two images of van Alystne from the 1960s in their digital archive.

=== Major exhibitions ===
- Pollock Gallery, Toronto, Ontario
- Art Gallery of Northumberland, Coburg, Ontario

=== Awards and nominations ===
In 1977, Alystne was elected a member of the Royal Canadian Academy of Arts.

Alstyne was listed in both the International Who's Who and the Canadian Who's Who (1981–83).
