= Barbara Jayne Orser =

Canadian academic

Barbara Jayne Orser (born 1957, daughter of Earl Orser) is a professor of management in the Telfer School of Management, University of Ottawa where she teaches entrepreneurship. Her research focuses on gender influences in the venture creation process.

== Biography ==
Barbara Orser has a Hon. B.A. from the University of Waterloo; M.B.A. from the Schulich School of Business, York University; and Ph.D. from the School of Management, University of Branford. She was previously Vice Dean (Career Development) at the Telfer School of Management, University of Ottawa.

Her research interests are in the fields of entrepreneurial feminism, small firm growth, small business programming and public policy. Her earlier scholarly writing centered on psycho-social influences in entrepreneurial decision-making. Barbara Orser has published in academic and trade publications applying insights from finance and globalization.

In 1994, she and Allan Riding created a new resource for students studying financing in Canada. A study she co-authored with Riding found that while women and men businessowners in Canada both applied for financing, only women rarely applied for equity financing. She is co-author of Feminine Capital. Unlocking the Power of Women Entrepreneurs (2015) with Catherine Elliott and the Founding Chair of the Canadian Taskforce for Women's Business Growth (2009-2011).

== Awards and honors ==
- Mount St. Vincent University Nancy's Chair Recipient (2013)
- University of Ottawa Telfer School of Management (2011) Award for Service, Teaching and Research.
- Executive Network (2010) 100 Most Power Women in Canada (Champion Category)
- The International Alliance of Women World of Difference 100 Awards (2010)
