= Earl Orser =

Canadian businessman (1928–2004)

Earl Herbert Orser
- Born: July 5, 1928; Toronto, Ontario
- Died: December 26, 2004 (aged 76); London, Ontario
- Education: Danforth Technical School ('46); University of Toronto (BCom '50)
- Spouse: Marion Queenie Ellis (m. 1951)

Earl Herbert Orser CM (July 5, 1928 – December 26, 2004) was a Canadian businessman.

Born in Toronto, Ontario, the son of Frank Herbert Orser and Ethel Majorie Cox, Orser attended Danforth Technical School. Support from the Leonard Foundation, a financial assistance program for students enrolled in an undergraduate degree program in a Canadian university, allowed him to attend the University of Toronto in 1946. Following graduation, he earned his C.A. In 1973, he joined the T. Eaton Company Limited and became President and CEO from 1975 to 1977. While at Eaton's, Orser gained a reputation, perhaps unfairly, as the man who ended the iconic Eaton's mail order catalogue in 1976. The decision to end the catalogue was made by the members of the Eaton family who controlled the company, but Orser deftly handled the operational, labour, political and public relations difficulties that arose from the closing of such a long-standing institution.

After his stint with Eaton's, Orser moved to London, Ontario and joined the London Life Insurance Company, becoming President and CEO in 1980, Chairman in 1989 and Honorary Chairman in 1994.

He was a director of SPAR Aerospace Ltd. commencing in 1978 and was Chairman for five years.

Orser was also a former chair of the Board of Governors at The University of Western Ontario.

He was named a Member of the Order of Canada in 1997. In 1991, he received an honorary Doctorate of Laws from the University of Western Ontario. He is a Fellow of the Ontario Institute of Chartered Accountants (FCA). In 1997, he was inducted into the London Business Hall of Fame.

He married Marion and had four daughters: Darlene Funnell, Barbara Orser, Beverley Orser and Nancy Hart.

Orser died of cancer.
