= Eaton's =

Canadian department store (1869–1999)

The T. Eaton Company Limited
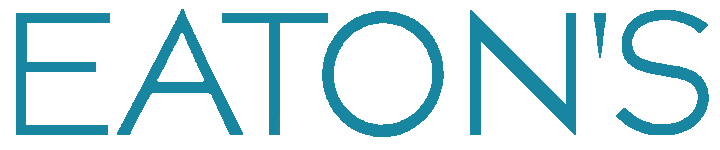

- Exterior of the former flagship store at the Eaton Centre (1977)
- Trade name: Eaton's
- Industry: Retail
- Genre: Department stores
- Founded: 8 December 1869; 156 years ago
- Founder: Timothy Eaton
- Defunct: 30 December 1999; 26 years ago
- Fate: Bankruptcy and acquisition by Sears Canada
- Headquarters: Toronto, Ontario, Canada
- Number of locations: 64 (at bankruptcy, 1999); 7 (at closing, 2002)
- Area served: Canada
- Key people: John Craig Eaton; John David Eaton
- Number of employees: 70,000
- Parent: Sears Canada (1999–2002)

The T. Eaton Company Limited, known commonly as Eaton's, was a Canadian department store chain that existed from 1869 to 1999. It was founded in Toronto by Timothy Eaton, an immigrant from what is now Northern Ireland. Eaton's grew to become a retail and social institution in Canada, with stores across the country, buying-offices around the globe, and a mail-order catalogue that was found in the homes of most Canadians. A changing economic and retail environment in the late twentieth century, along with mismanagement, culminated in the chain's bankruptcy in 1999.

Eaton's pioneered several retail innovations. In an era when haggling for goods was the norm, the chain proclaimed "We propose to sell our goods for CASH ONLY – In selling goods, to have only one price." In addition, it had the long-standing slogan "Goods Satisfactory or Money Refunded."

== Early years ==
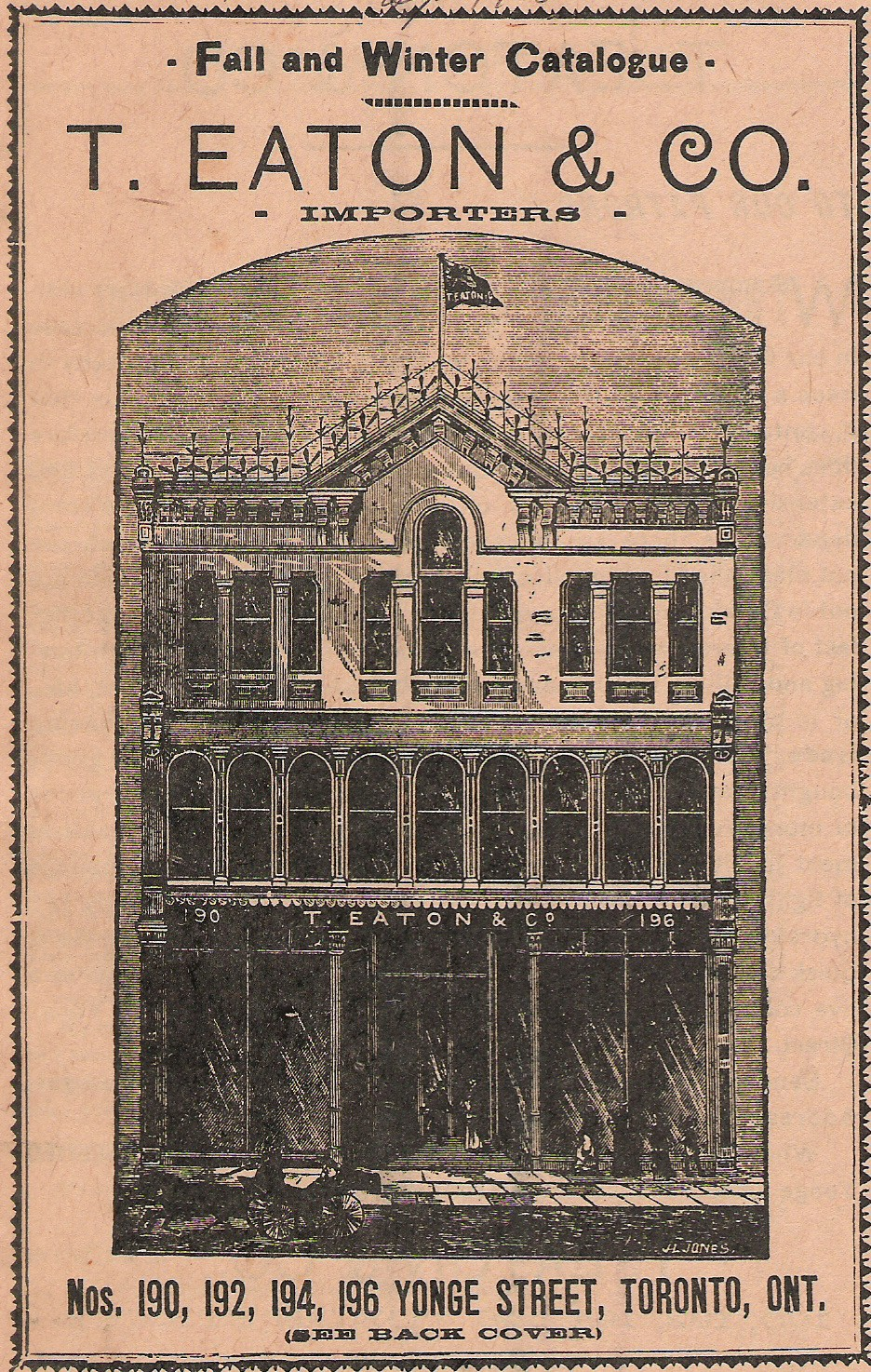
The cover of the first Eaton's catalogue, published in 1884.

In 1869, Timothy Eaton sold his interest in a small dry-goods store in the market town of St. Marys, Ontario, and he bought a dry-goods and haberdashery business at 178 Yonge Street in the city of Toronto.

The first store was only 7 m × 18 m (24 ft × 60 ft), with two shop windows, and was located a fair distance from Toronto's then fashionable shopping district of King Street West. In its first year of operation, with Timothy Eaton responsible for buying the goods to stock the store, and a staff of four, expectations were low that a store with a no-credit and no-haggling policy would succeed.

The business prospered, and Eaton moved the store one block north in August 1883 into much larger premises at 190 Yonge Street. The new store boasted the biggest plate-glass windows in Toronto, the first electric lights in any Canadian store, three full floors of retail space featuring 35 departments, and a lightwell that ran the full length of the store. The store's first telephone, with phone number 370, was installed in 1885. In 1886, the first elevator in a retail establishment in Toronto was installed in the Eaton store (although only customers going up were invited to use the elevator, thus requiring them to pass by the various store displays on their walk down).

Eaton maintained the lease on the empty store at 178 Yonge Street until its expiry in 1884, in order to delay the expansion plans of one of his competitors, Robert Simpson. Over time, the competition between the Simpson's and Eaton's department stores, facing each other across Queen Street West, became one of Toronto's great business rivalries. The pedestrian crosswalk on Queen Street West, just to the west of the intersection with Yonge Street, was for years one of the busiest in Canada, as thousands of shoppers a day comparison-shopped between Eaton's and Simpson's.

By 1896, Eaton's was billing itself as "Canada's Greatest Store". The store continued to expand in size, and new buildings were constructed to house the mail order division and the Eaton's factories. The number of people employed in Eaton's operations numbered 17,500 in 1911. In 1919, the Eaton's buildings in Toronto contained a floor space of over 24 ha (60 acres), and occupied several city blocks between Yonge Street and Bay Street, north of Queen Street West.

== The Winnipeg store ==
At the beginning of the 20th century, Eaton's conducted a large business in Western Canada through its catalogue. Eaton's considered Winnipeg, Manitoba, as the most logical location for a new mail order warehouse to better serve its western customers. A store was not originally part of the plans.

John Craig Eaton, the son of Timothy Eaton, became an early proponent of building a combined store and mail order operation in Winnipeg. Although Timothy Eaton initially had misgivings over the difficulties involved in managing a store 2,100 km (1,300 mi) from Toronto, John Craig was eventually able to convince his father. Eaton's acquired a city block on Portage Avenue at Donald Street, and the five-storey Eaton's store opened to much fanfare on 15 July 1905. Timothy Eaton and his family were on hand for the opening of the second Eaton's store, with the Winnipeg Daily Tribune noting in its front-page headline: "The Canadian Napoleon of Retail Commerce Reaches the Capital – Views His Great Store for First Time – Well Pleased".

The landmark red brick store, known as "the Big Store" to Winnipeggers, was a success. The initial staff of 750 grew to 1,200 within a few weeks of the opening. By 1910, three more storeys were added to the store and other buildings were constructed. By 1919, the Eaton's operations in Winnipeg covered 8.5 ha (21 acres) and employed 8,000 people.

For many years, the Winnipeg Eaton's store was considered the most successful department store in the world, given how it dominated its local market. As late as the 1960s, Canadian Magazine estimated that Winnipeggers spent more than 50 cents of every shopping dollar (excluding groceries) at Eaton's, and that on a busy day, one out of every ten Winnipeggers would visit the Portage Avenue store.

The store closed on 17 October 1999, along with 36 other Eaton's stores.

== Overseas buying offices ==
Eaton's had two buying offices located in Europe: in London, in 7 Warwick Lane, opened in 1892; and Paris, at 103 rue Reaumur, opened six years later in 1898.

== Canada's dominant retailer ==
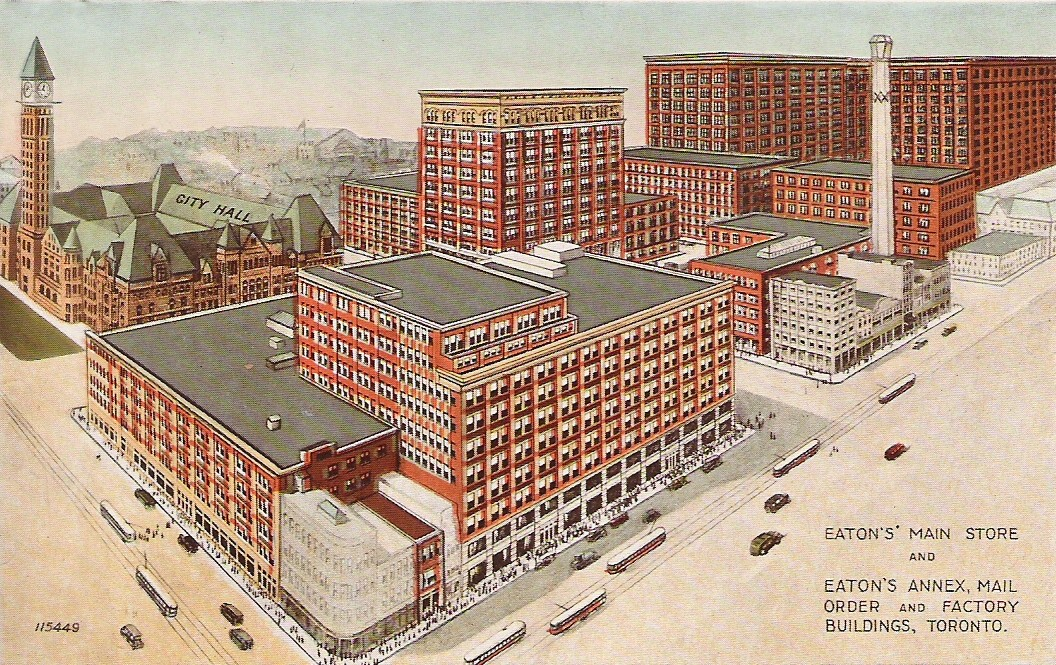
The Eaton's store, the Eaton's Annex, mail order facilities and factories in Toronto, at Yonge and Queen Streets, in 1920.

The success of Eaton's helped revolutionize department store retailing in North America. US retailers flocked to view the stores on Yonge Street and Portage Avenue, anxious to replicate Timothy Eaton's methods south of the border. Until the 1950s, Eaton's promoted itself as the "largest retail organization in the British Empire".

In 1905, The Globe wrote: "There is hardly a name in Canada, with the possible exception of the Prime Minister, so well known to the people at large as that of Mr. Timothy Eaton." Timothy Eaton died in 1907, and was succeeded by John Craig Eaton as President of the T. Eaton Co. Limited. The company's success continued under Timothy's heir.

In 1925, Eaton's purchased the Goodwin's store in Montreal. By 1927, Montreal boasted a new six-storey Eaton's store on Saint Catherine Street, which was expanded to nine storeys in 1930. Over time, Eaton's stores opened in other cities across the country, the company offered numerous private label products, e.g., an Eaton's typewriter, a rebadged Silverette model by Silver Seiko Ltd. of Japan.

In 1977, the Toronto Eaton Centre opened in downtown Toronto, replacing two previous downtown Eaton's stores. The complex—stretching 400 m (1,300 ft) on multiple levels between Dundas and Queen Streets and boasting 200 stores—was anchored at the north end by a nine-storey Eaton's store.

Eaton's sold private label appliances under the "Viking" label. These were largely manufactured by White. Many products were sold with the brand name “TECO”, an acronym for Timothy Eaton Company.

== The Eaton's catalogue ==
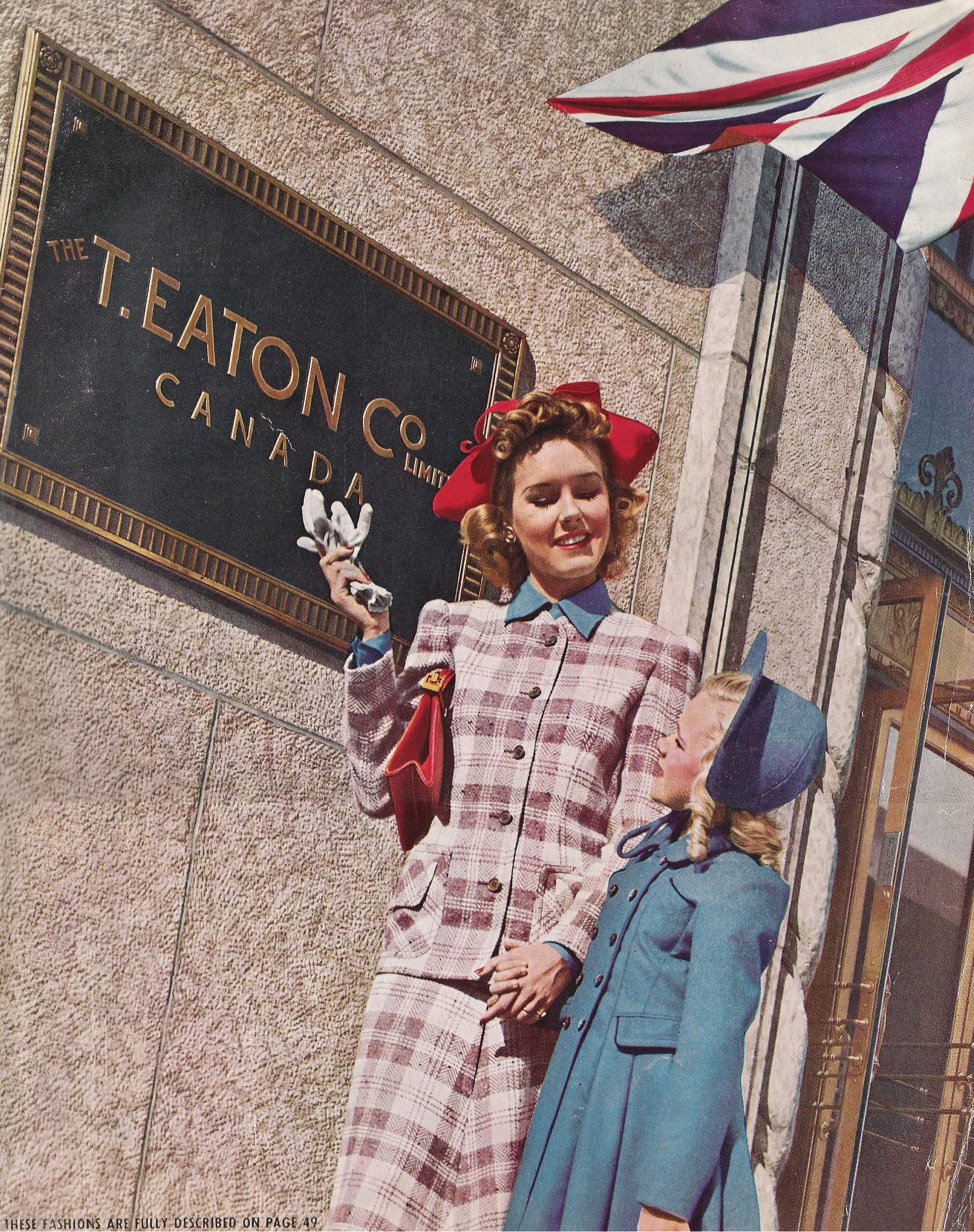
Cover photo of Eaton's Spring and Summer Catalogue 1942

The first Eaton's catalogue was a 34-page booklet issued in 1884. As Eaton's grew, so did the catalogue. By 1920, Eaton's operated mail order warehouses in Winnipeg, Toronto and Moncton to serve its catalogue customers. Catalogue order offices were also established throughout the country, with the first opening in Oakville in 1916.

At a time when Canada's population was predominantly rural, often living in isolated settlements, the Eaton's catalogue provided a selection of goods that was otherwise unavailable to many Canadians, much like the Sears Roebuck catalogue in the United States. It served an important economic role, as it broke local monopolies and allowed all Canadians access to the prices and selection enjoyed in some of the larger cities. The catalogue offered everything from clothing to farming implements. Some Canadians even purchased their homes from the catalogue, with Eaton's delivering to them all the materials necessary to build a prefabricated house. Today, a large number of Eaton's catalogue homes still exist throughout the country, primarily in Western Canada. The catalogue had many other uses, ranging from its use as a learning tool by settlers learning to speak English, to its use as goalie pads during hockey games.

The catalogue became an icon of Canadian culture, even appearing in many works of Canadian literature. In Roch Carrier's autobiographical short story The Hockey Sweater, a young Quebec boy asks his mother for a Montreal Canadiens hockey jersey from the Eaton's catalogue, but receives a Toronto Maple Leafs jersey instead. As the family is francophone, the mother does not order using the catalogue forms (which are in English only) but instead writes a note and sends money to the department store. Because of the prevalent language and cultural barriers of the English and French-speaking Canadian populations, his family is unaware that the item could be exchanged, and they do not wish to offend Mr. Eaton by returning it. Carrier ends up being ostracized by his peers as a result.

Over time, the catalogue became a less profitable operation, and by the 1970s, it was a money-losing proposition. As Canada's population became more urban over the course of the 20th century, Canadians had access to a greater number of local stores, and were less reliant on catalogue purchases. By the mid-1970s, it was estimated that 60% of the suburban customers throughout Canada lived within a thirty-minute drive of an Eaton's store. Others blamed Eaton's management for the catalogue's failures, pointing to the similar Simpsons-Sears catalogue (later the Sears Canada catalogue), which continued until a much later date even though it never enjoyed the iconic status or popularity of the Eaton's catalogue.

At a news conference on January 14, 1976, Eaton's announced that the 1976 spring-summer catalogue would be their last. 9000 mail-order employees were out of work and many Eaton's catalogue stores in smaller towns closed as a result. Many Canadians were in shock. In one notable incident, Barbara Frum of CBC Radio’s As It Happens opened her interview of Eaton's president Earl Orser with the question "Mr. Orser, how could you?"

== The Toronto Santa Claus Parade ==
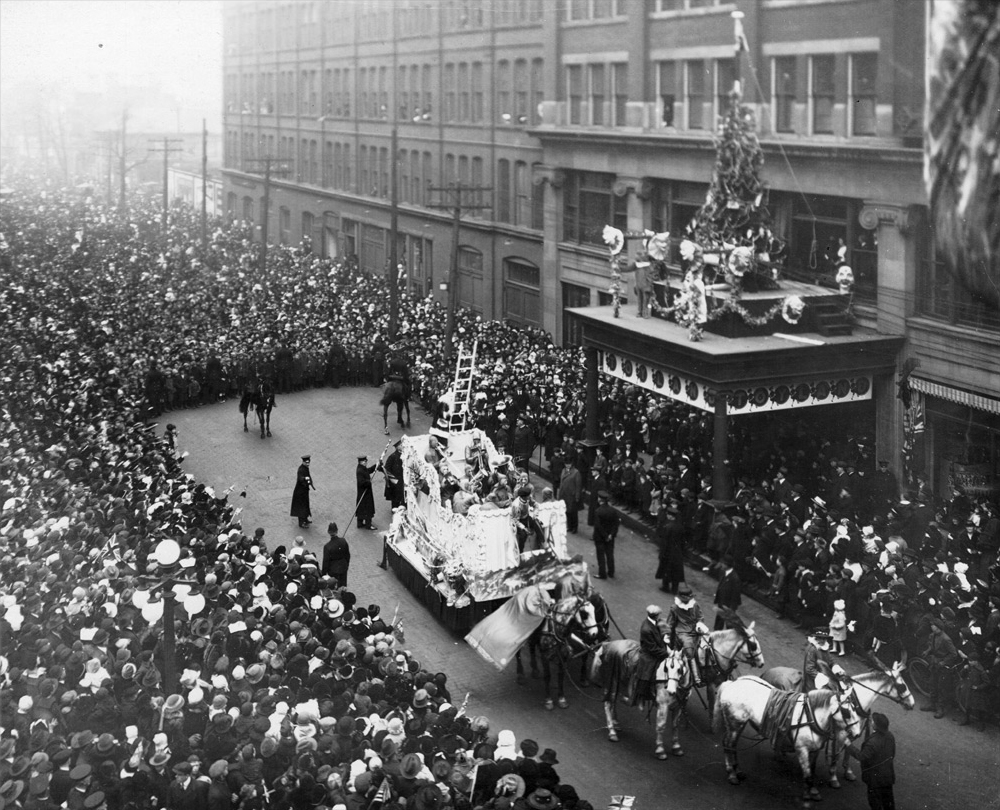
Eaton's Santa Claus Parade, 1918, Toronto, Ontario, Canada. Having arrived at the Eaton's store, Santa is readying his ladder to climb up onto the building.

Eaton sponsored the annual Eaton's Santa Claus Parade in Toronto. The first parade took place on December 2, 1905. For a number of years, Eaton's Santa Claus Parades were also held in Winnipeg and Montreal.

By the 1950s, the Toronto parade was the largest in North America, stretching for a mile and a half and involving thousands of participants. It was broadcast live on radio and television in Canada, and CBS television in the United States broadcast the parade for a number of years.

To publicize the parade, Eaton's published a number of books and records about a sad little bear called Punkinhead (originally created by Charles Thorson) who becomes Santa's sidekick and takes part in Santa's parade. A Punkinhead character was included in the parade for many years.

In August 1982, Eaton's announced that it would no longer sponsor the Santa Claus Parade, due to increasing costs. A consortium of local businesses saved the parade, which continues to be held every year.

== Decline ==
=== Unsuccessful expansion ===
In the 1970s, Eaton's tried to expand its reach in Canadian retailing by opening a chain of discount or "junior" department stores called Horizon. The Horizon chain was closed in 1978.

In the 1970s and 1980s, through the provincial government's Ontario Downtown Renewal Program, Eaton's was a partner in the development of downtown malls in smaller cities, intended to foster the revitalization of urban cores. As the chain formed the anchor of many of these shopping centres, these often carried the "Eaton Centre" name. Nearly all these malls—in cities such as Sarnia, Brantford, Guelph and Peterborough—had high vacancy rates and poor patronage, and contributed to the store's financial problems.

=== Suburban competition ===
The economic recession of the early 1980s hurt the company. The Hudson's Bay Company, Sears Canada, and Zellers all took market share from Eaton's. By the 1990s, US retailers, most notably Walmart, were expanding into Canada, and Eaton's found it increasingly difficult to compete.

Retailing and land use trends in the last decades of the 20th century did not favour Eaton's. Traditional department stores, including Eaton's, commanded an ever-shrinking share of the Canadian retail dollar, as big-box stores, such as Walmart and Zellers, and specialty stores expanded their shares of retail sales. With the advent of urban sprawl, most Canadian downtown shopping districts (which were historically dominated by Eaton's) had to increasingly share retail sales with growing suburban shopping areas, where Eaton's was just one of many competitors.

=== Family mismanagement ===
Eaton's difficulties were not all caused by external forces. Poor management by the last two generations of Eaton family members to run the chain contributed to the demise of Eaton's. Stores that once served as landmarks in their communities were not renovated. New Eaton's stores built since the 1960s were largely indistinguishable from other chain stores, further reducing Eaton's status as a destination.

The end of the catalogue and of the Eaton's Santa Claus parades, though being cost-saving measures, ensured Eaton's no longer held the same place in Canadians' hearts.

The chain that had touted itself in the 1940s and 1950s as "The Store for Young Canada" lost touch with younger customers, and unintentionally became known as a chain that catered to older shoppers. Once known for its superior customer service (with its staff proudly known as "Eatonians"), Eaton's began to cut back on sales staff and training in an effort to trim costs. A chain that had once prided itself on its buying offices throughout the globe and on the unique and diverse goods that it offered its customers had, by the latter half of the twentieth century, become an antiquated supply chain and a haphazard and confused approach to merchandising.

In one particularly disastrous move, Eaton's moved to an "Everyday Value Pricing" strategy (also known as "Eaton Value") in 1991, which meant that all discounts and sales, including Eaton's famous Trans-Canada Sale, were eliminated. The strategy quickly drove away customers, but was continued for four years before it was abandoned.

In 1997, seeing the success of The Bay in higher-end retailing, Eaton's lured their chief executive George Kosich over to try to duplicate the strategy. The Hudson's Bay Company filed a lawsuit saying that Kosich had violated his employment contract. Eaton's had also sued HBC for poaching several of its executives. Aside from that controversy, the new retailing strategy was not only unsuccessful, it also gave rival Sears Canada the opportunity to move up to the market segment long dominated by Eaton's. Kosich resigned in 1998 and was replaced by chairman Brent Ballantyne.

== Bankruptcy ==
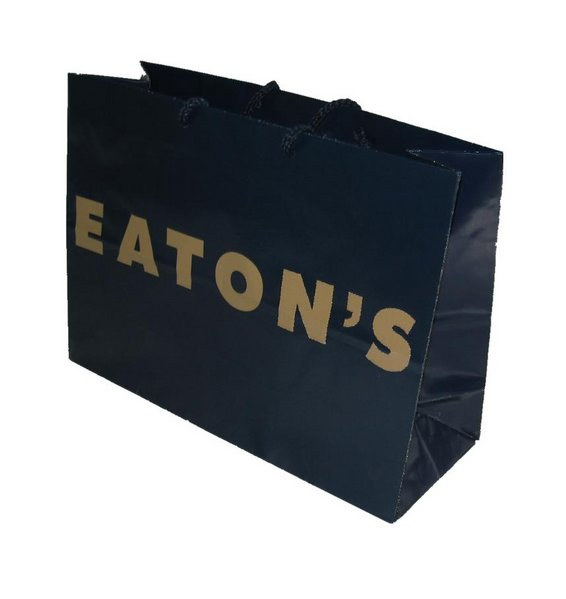
An Eaton's shopping bag, circa 1997

The chain, which controlled almost 60% of all department store sales in Canada in 1930, had been reduced to a market share of 10.6% in 1997. The T. Eaton Co. first filed for bankruptcy protection in 1997. At the time, the company had an estimated 24,500 employees and over 90 retail outlets. The plan was to close 31 underperforming stores, including two-thirds of its stores in Alberta. However, Eaton's limited the number of store closures to 17. George Eaton, the last of the family to be involved in management, resigned as chief executive in 1997, being succeeded by George Kosich. In September of that year, creditors approved the restructuring plan.

In 1998, George Kosich resigned as chairman of the board and was succeeded by Brent Ballantyne, under whom the company was taken public for the first time in its history, issuing 11.7 million common shares at $15 each, while the Eaton family retained control with a 51 percent stake.

The chain finally folded in 1999 after operating for 130 years. Though it had reduced its retail outlets, it finished 1998 with a net loss of $72 million, and it announced further closures and a corporate restructuring plan. This was unsuccessful and the company went bankrupt in August 1999. It had at the time 64 department stores, two home stores and one warehouse.

By late October 1999, nearly all of the Eaton's stores had been liquidated and closed. The only stores with the Eaton's name that were left in the country at this point were five suburban locations at Brentwood Mall, St. Vital Centre, Galeries de la Capitale, Westmount Shopping Centre, and Sherway Gardens that were being operated by Sears Canada while waiting approval to officially acquire them. In early October 1999, Sears reverted to regular prices the merchandise in these five stores (still under the Eaton's banner) while the rest of the chain run by T. Eaton Co. continued in parallel its liquidation sale in the other locations with goods up to 70% off.

=== Acquisition by Sears ===
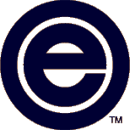
Eaton's logo of a lowercase e used from 1998 to 2002

In September 1999, Sears Canada purchased all the shares of T. Eaton Co., eight of its stores, with the option to buy five more, and the Eaton's name, trademarks, brands, and website in a $30-million deal. In October 1999, Sears Canada added five downtown stores to the suburban locations it had purchased earlier in September with an option to buy yet another Eaton's outlet. The acquisition of Eaton's assets by Sears Canada was officially approved in November 1999. The ten suburban locations that Sears Canada acquired would be converted to its nameplate while the six downtown stores would operate under the Eaton's banner. However, it was later decided that the suburban Yorkdale location would be run as an Eaton's store instead of a Sears contrary to what had originally been stated, thus bringing to seven the number of Eaton's-branded outlets. Most of the locations that Sears Canada acquired were closed in October 1999 by the T. Eaton Company itself before getting renovated and eventually reopening as Sears or Eaton's stores. However, five of the suburban locations would directly be rebranded as Sears stores without closing. Moreover, the suburban locations at Scarborough Town Centre and Halifax Shopping Centre were acquired to actually relocate existing Sears stores with their employees to the much larger former Eaton's spaces of these same malls (this was also the original plan for Yorkdale). Finally, it was announced in December 1999 that two leases formerly occupied by Eaton's at Guildford Town Centre and Don Mills Centre would become Sears stores but these two were separate arrangements with the landlords of the respective shopping malls and, as such, not part of the 16 locations acquired by Sears Canada from T. Eaton Company.

Through its new Eaton's chain, Sears held a number of prime locations in Toronto (Eaton Centre and Yorkdale), Vancouver (Pacific Centre), Victoria (Eaton Centre), Winnipeg (Polo Park), Ottawa (Rideau Centre), and Calgary (Eaton Centre). Sears had intended to obtain the former downtown Montreal store, although it lost out to Les Ailes de la Mode. Sears had great ambitions for its seven Eaton's stores which included staffing them with spas, entertainment, food, personal-shopping assistants and brand-name merchandise. The Eaton's catalogue and website would be relaunched as well. However, Sears had trouble securing name brand merchandise consistent with the image of the new chain. This was mainly because of Eaton's bankruptcy. It was also because of doubt in Sears' ability to manage an upper-end chain, since until recently their merchandise was of lower price and quality compared to the old Eaton's and The Bay. George Heller, then-president of rival department store The Bay, publicly warned vendors not to supply the new Eaton's with merchandise. Many mid-to-upper tier brands, particularly in clothing, feared reprisal and avoided the new Eaton's.

The new Eaton's was scheduled to open 1 September 2000, but was pushed back three times, eventually opening 25 November. Consequently, Eaton's had missed much of the lucrative holiday season and opened with merchandise already marked down. Construction was haphazard; all stores opened unfinished and renovations would continue well into 2001.

The seven-store experiment was not successful, and Sears Canada President Paul Walters was forced to resign. He was replaced by a former rival and Sears Roebuck executive from the U.S., Mark Cohen, who prioritized Sears over Eaton's and cut back aggressively on markdown strategies. By March 2001, Sears announced they were ceasing publication of the newly resurrected Eaton's catalogue "due to a lack of interest". Although Mark Cohen officially announced that the Eaton's chain had seen an impressive rebound in June 2001, by 2002 he retired the "Eaton's" name.

Of the seven locations involved in this experiment, those in Winnipeg and Victoria, which were close to existing Sears stores (and, in the case of Winnipeg, in the same mall) were sold to rival department store The Bay. Yorkdale likewise already had a Sears (as well as The Bay) and so the Eaton's space was redeveloped for smaller retailers. The four remaining locations were rebranded as Sears, but ultimately all closed between 2008 and 2015 as Sears itself faced difficulties. These spaces were subsequently taken over mainly by Holt Renfrew (Calgary) and Nordstrom (in Ottawa, Vancouver, and downtown Toronto), though Sears Canada retained the top floors of the former Toronto Eaton Centre location for its head offices.

Sears Canada's difficulties continued throughout the 2010s; the company filed for creditor protection in June 2017, forcing it to put all its stores in liquidation by October that year. On January 14, 2018, Sears Canada ceased operating and permanently closed its remaining stores, succumbing to the same fate as Eaton's had 19 years earlier.

== Legacy ==
Eaton's transformed retailing in Canada, and its methods were eagerly adopted by retailers throughout the world. Many approaches to sales and service that are taken for granted by customers today were originally popularised by Timothy Eaton and his store.

Many Canadians, particularly older Canadians, have fond memories of the Eaton's stores and the catalogue. Few defunct companies evoke the same strong emotions among Canadians as does Eaton's.

Two shopping centres in Canada continue to be called Eaton Centres, namely the Toronto Eaton Centre and the Montreal Eaton Centre, located in those cities' downtown cores. The Toronto Eaton Centre is a tourist attraction in Toronto, with over one million visitors a week.

=== Architecture ===
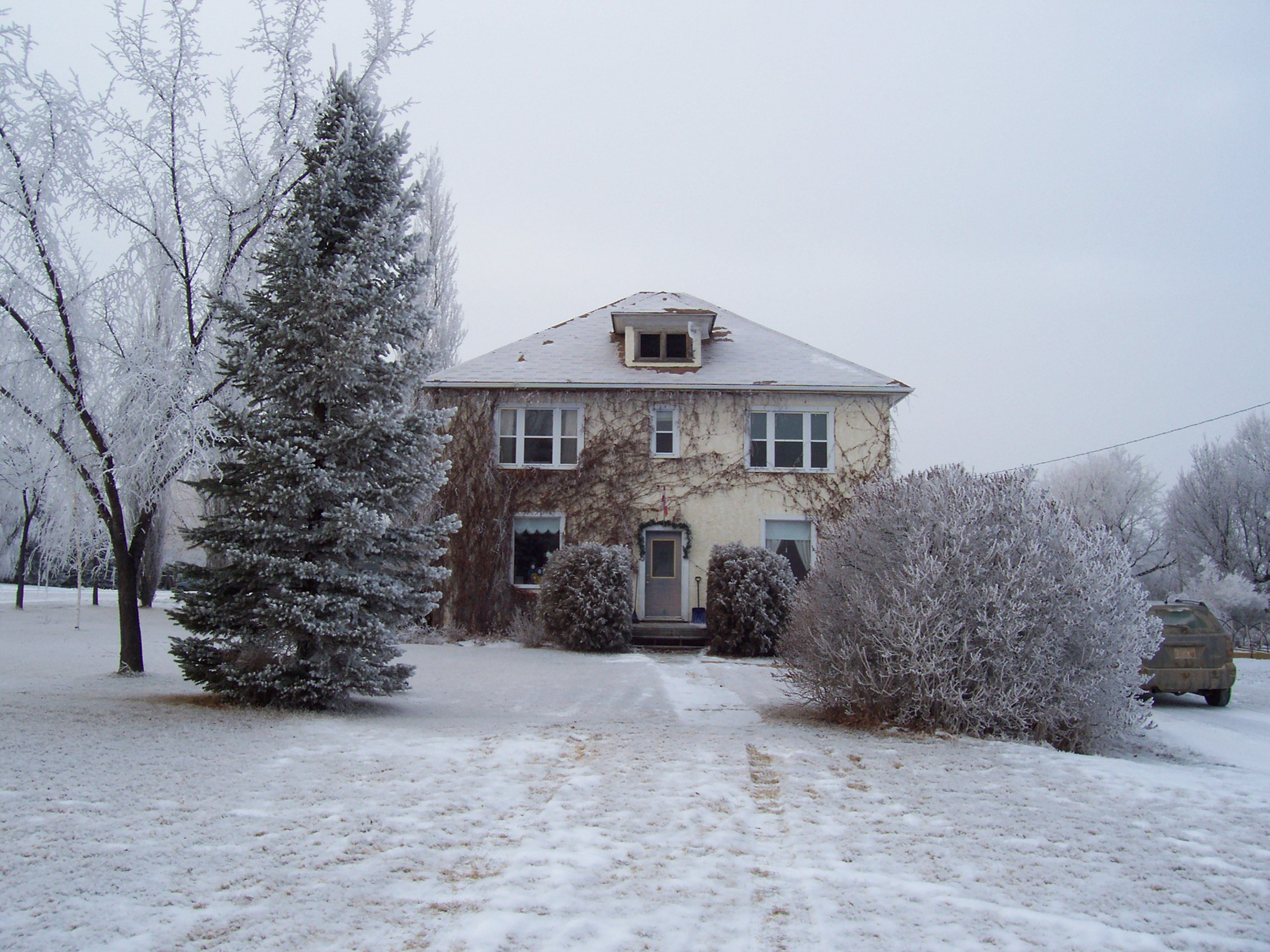
Built in 1917, the Neils Hogenson House was ordered from the Eaton's Catalogue, and sent as a kit. This example is located in Stirling, Alberta.

Eaton's leaves an architectural legacy, primarily through the work of the architecture firm Ross and Macdonald. Eaton's College Street in Toronto, opened in 1930, is a highly regarded Art Deco building, and is currently used as a retail, office and residential complex. The Seventh Floor, occupied by the Eaton Auditorium and the Round Room restaurant, was recently restored and now operates as The Carlu event venue. In 1971, the Eaton's / John Maryon Tower near Eaton's College Street was proposed by Eaton's and a developer named John Maryon, but it was never built.

The former downtown Eaton's store in Montreal, also designed by Ross and Macdonald, remains a landmark on Saint Catherine Street and is now an extension of the Montreal Eaton Centre, although only the outer building's shell (excluding the top floor) remains. Preserved within the top floor is the former Ninth Floor Restaurant, which had been closed to the public since Eaton's bankruptcy in 1999. It reopened in 2024 after extensive restoration and renovation work and now a venue space for special events and a small restaurant called "Ile de France" (the original restaurant space has been repurposed as an events hall). It is protected as a registered historical site because of its rich Art deco design.

Another Ross and Macdonald-designed landmark, the former Eaton's store in downtown Saskatoon, now serves as the offices of the Saskatoon Board of Education after housing an Army & Navy department store for decades following Eaton's relocation to Midtown Plaza in the 1960s.

The long-time Downtown Calgary store, designed by Ross and Macdonald in the 1920s, was largely demolished in 1988, although two facades were preserved and incorporated into a new Holt Renfrew store as part of a redevelopment of Calgary Eaton Centre (in 2009 Holt Renfrew re-opened in what was once Eaton's second downtown location).

The original downtown Vancouver store, on Hastings Street, also remains and now serves as the downtown Harbour Centre campus of Simon Fraser University. Some Vancouver residents associate this heritage building with the Spencer's Department Store (which commissioned the construction of the store), rather than Eaton's (which bought Spencer's in 1948 and occupied the store until the 1970s). In fact, the former Eaton's store is today known as the Spencer Building.

Not all former Eaton's stores are architectural landmarks: the stores constructed from the 1960s onwards were typically architecturally inferior to their predecessors. Notably, the exterior of the Toronto Eaton Centre store can best be described as a mustard-coloured box and is generally considered (from an architectural perspective) to be a poor replacement for the demolished Main Store. Designed in the style of the 1970s and intended at that time to be a statement of Eaton's dominance and its future aspirations, the modern design of this behemoth has not aged well (despite efforts by Sears Canada in 1999–2000 to improve the look of the building facades). Similarly, the main Vancouver store, connected to the downtown Pacific Centre mall, was also built in the 1970s as a large, white box.

After the demise of Eaton's, most stores were converted to other retail banners or other uses, with the downtown Winnipeg store generating the most controversy. When the store was emptied in late 1999, various alternative uses for the building (including residential condominiums) were considered, and ultimately all rejected. After a highly emotional civic debate, which included a "group hug" of the "Big Store" by hundreds of people in 2001, the store was demolished in 2002 to make way for a hockey arena, the MTS Centre. In one concession to history, red bricks were incorporated into the design of the arena façade, evoking the memory of the Eaton's store that had once graced Portage Avenue.

=== Timothy Eaton statue ===
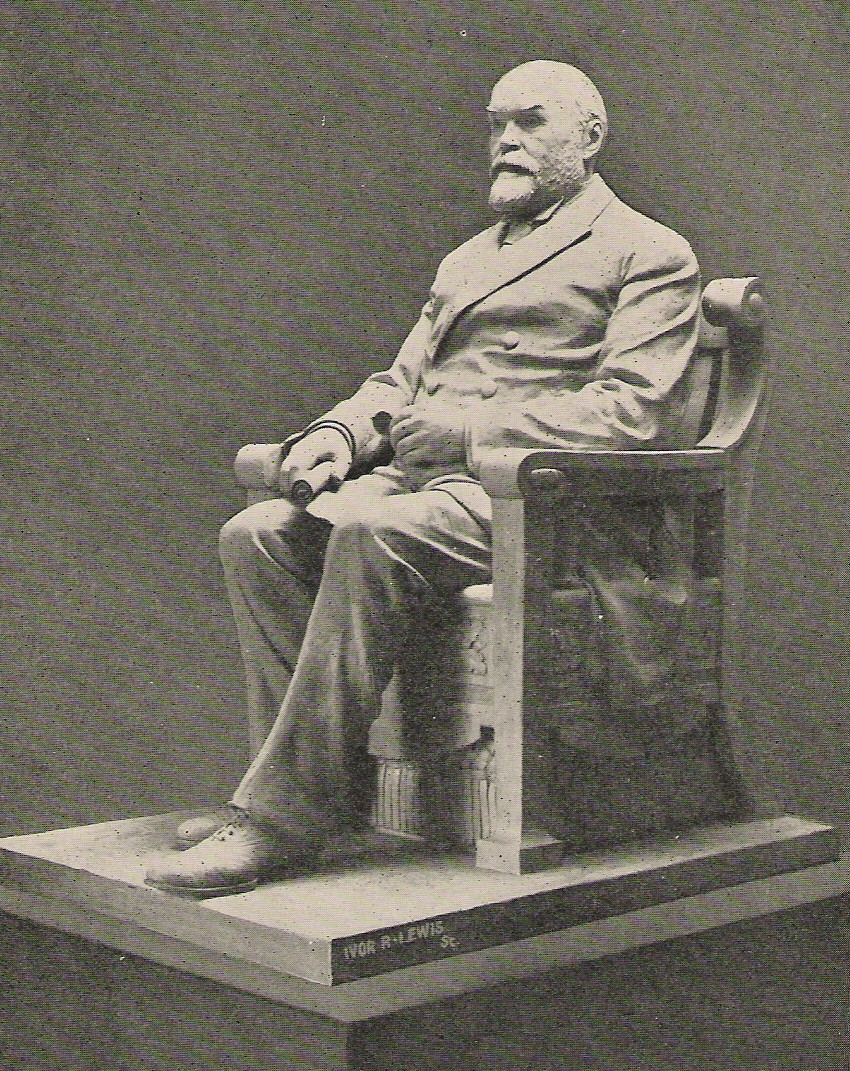
Bronze Timothy Eaton statue, Toronto (1919)

In 1919, two life-sized statues of Timothy Eaton were donated by Eaton's employees to the Toronto and Winnipeg stores, in celebration of the 50th anniversary of the company. The Toronto statue is now exhibited in the Royal Ontario Museum. The Winnipeg statue was housed in the suburban Polo Park Mall for a few years after 1999, until the Hudson's Bay Company opened a Bay store at that location and wanted the statue of its former competitor removed. After a tussle with the Eaton family, who wanted to move the statue to St Marys, Ontario, the Manitoba government declared it a provincial heritage object. It now sits in the city's primary arena, Canada Life Centre, one floor up from nearly the same spot where it stood in the old store. People often rubbed the toe of the statue's left shoe since it is believed by some to bring good luck to do so. As a result, the toe is much shinier than any other part of the statue.

=== Unsuccessful catalogue revival ===
In early 2008 The Globe and Mail reported a possible revival of the Eaton's brand by Sears Canada. The company was considering reviving the defunct catalogue with an online presence. The chain's intellectual property subsidiary applied for new trademarks incorporating the name "Timothy Eaton", and continued to pursue registration of these into early 2009. The trademark lapsed and was abandoned by late 2013.

In December 2016, a few months before its filing for creditor protection and subsequent liquidation, Sears Canada sold the remaining Eaton's intellectual property to a company affiliated with Cadillac Fairview, the current owner of the Toronto Eaton Centre.

== Leadership ==
=== President ===
1. Timothy Eaton, 1869 – 31 January 1907 †
2. Sir John Craig Eaton, 1 February 1907 – 30 March 1922 †
3. Robert Young Eaton, 13 April 1922 – 9 December 1942
4. John David Eaton, 9 December 1942 – 6 August 1969
5. Robert John Butler, 6 August 1969 – 12 March 1975
6. Earl Herbert Orser, 12 March 1975 – 17 May 1977
7. Fredrik Stefan Eaton, 17 May 1977 – 1988
8. George Ross Eaton, 1988 – 5 June 1997
9. George John Kosich, 5 June 1997 – 16 November 1998
10. Gordon Brent Ballantyne, 16 November 1998 – 24 August 1999

=== Chairman of the Board ===
1. David Kinnear, 6 August 1969 – May 1973
2. Robert John Butler, 12 March 1975 – April 1977
3. Fredrik Stefan Eaton, 17 May 1977 – 1997
4. George Ross Eaton, 27 February 1997 – 31 December 1997
5. Gordon Brent Ballantyne, 1 January 1998 – 30 December 1999

=== Chief Executive Officer ===
1. James Ross Jenkins, 20 February 1962 – November 1965
2. David Kinnear, November 1965 – 6 August 1969
3. Robert John Butler, 6 August 1969 – 12 March 1975
4. Earl Herbert Orser, 12 March 1975 – 17 May 1977
5. Fredrik Stefan Eaton, 17 May 1977 – 1988
6. George Ross Eaton, 1988 – 5 June 1997
7. George John Kosich, 5 June 1997 – 16 November 1998
8. Gordon Brent Ballantyne, 16 November 1998 – 24 August 1999

† = died in office

== See also ==
- List of Canadian department stores

== Suggested reading ==
- Anderson, Carol and Mallison, Katharine, Lunch With Lady Eaton: Inside the Dining Rooms of a Nation, Toronto: ECW Press, 2004.
- Belisle, Donica. Retail Nation: Department Stores and the Making of Modern Canada. Vancouver: UBC Press, 2011.
- Belisle, Donica. "Negotiating Paternalism: Women and Canada's Largest Department Stores, 1890–1960,” The Journal of Women's History 19:1 (Spring 2007), 58–81.
- Belisle, Donica. "A Labour Force for the Consumer Century: Commodification in Canada's Largest Department Stores, 1890–1940," Labour/Le Travail 58:2 (Fall 2006), 107–144.
- Belisle, Donica. "Exploring Postwar Consumption: The Campaign to Unionize Eaton's in Toronto, 1948–1952,” The Canadian Historical Review 86:4 (December 2005), 641–672.
- Eaton, Flora McCrea, Memory's Wall, Toronto: Clarke, Irwin & Company, 1956.
- Gourluck, Russ, A Store Like No Other: Eaton's of Winnipeg, Winnipeg: Great Plains Publications, 2004.
- Macpherson, Mary-Etta, Shopkeepers to a Nation, Toronto: McClelland and Stewart Limited, 1963.
- McQueen, Rod, The Eatons: The Rise and Fall of Canada's Royal Family, Toronto: Stoddart, 1998.
- Nasmith, George G., Timothy Eaton, Toronto: McClelland and Stewart Limited, 1923.
- Penfold, Steve, A Mile of Make Believe: A History of the Eaton's Santa Claus Parade, Toronto: University of Toronto Press, 2016.
- Phenix, Patricia, Eatonians: The Story of the Family Behind the Family, Toronto: McClelland and Stewart Limited, 2003.
- Santink, Joy L., Timothy Eaton and the Rise of His Department Store, Toronto: University of Toronto Press, 1990.
- Scribe, The, Golden Jubilee 1869–1919: A Book to Commemorate the Fiftieth Anniversary of the T. Eaton Co. Limited, Toronto: The T. Eaton Co. Limited, 1919.
- Staib, Kay, ed. Eaton 100: 1869–1969, A Special Centennial Edition of Eaton Quarterly, Toronto: Eaton's Consumer and Corporate Affairs, 1969.
- Staib, Kay, ed., The Dreams of Man – The Toronto Eaton Centre, Toronto: Eaton's Consumer and Corporate Affairs, 1977.
- Stephenson, William, The Store That Timothy Built, Toronto: McClelland and Stewart Limited, 1969.
