= John Craig Eaton II =

Canadian businessman (born 1937)

- Born: 30 May 1937 (age 89); Toronto, Ontario
- Education: Upper Canada College ('57); Harvard University

John Craig Eaton II (born May 30, 1937, in Toronto, Ontario) is a Canadian philanthropist and former businessman who is a member of the prominent Eaton family.

== Life and career ==
He is the great-grandson of Timothy Eaton, founder of the former Eaton's department store chain. He is married to his third wife, Sally Horsfall Eaton, a philanthropist and former registered nurse.

In his youth, Eaton attended Upper Canada College. He started working in the family business at Eaton's in 1954, becoming a director in 1967 and being appointed chairman of the board in 1969. The company went bankrupt in 1999 and was purchased by Sears Canada, which also subsequently went bankrupt.

He is a supporter of Ducks Unlimited Canada and was its president from 1990 to 1991. Eaton served as chancellor of Ryerson University from 1999 to 2006. In 2000, he was appointed chair of the board of governors of Ontario Parks.

== Honours and awards ==
- Doctor of Commerce (D.Com.), honoris causa, Ryerson University
- Knight of Justice (KStJ) of the Most Venerable Order of the Hospital of St. John of Jerusalem
- Member of the Order of Ontario (1991)

Academic offices
Preceded by David Crombie	Chancellor of Ryerson University; 1999–2006	Succeeded by G. Raymond Chang
