= Toronto Light Opera Association =

- Formation: 1940
- Dissolved: 1955
- Type: Opera company
- Location: Toronto, Ontario, Canada
- Founder and Music Director: Frederick Mawson
- Stage director: Alfred Kidney

The Toronto Light Opera Association was an opera company based in Toronto, Ontario, Canada that specialized in performing the works of Gilbert and Sullivan. It was founded in 1940 and disbanded in 1955.

== History ==
In 1940 Howard Mawson and some friends who had appeared in collegiate productions of Gilbert and Sullivan operas asked Mawson's father Frederick, a Toronto choirmaster and conductor, to teach them more about the performance of Gilbert and Sullivan's music. Frederick Mawson, with the help of his son, organized what was to become the Toronto Light Opera Association. Frederick Mawson also served as the association's music director and led it in presenting operettas in a number of venues in Toronto. Their first operetta, Trial by Jury, was staged in 1942 with H.M.S. Pinafore staged the following year. There were no productions in 1944, as many of the young cast members were involved in the war effort of World War II.

In 1945, the first notices naming the troupe as the Toronto Light Opera Association appeared in the local news. In 1946, the Toronto Daily Star termed it "an excellent organization", and another review in 1950 praised the "enjoyable acting and singing". Mawson was assisted in most of the productions by Alfred Kidney, who acted as stage director. The association disbanded in 1955.

== Productions ==
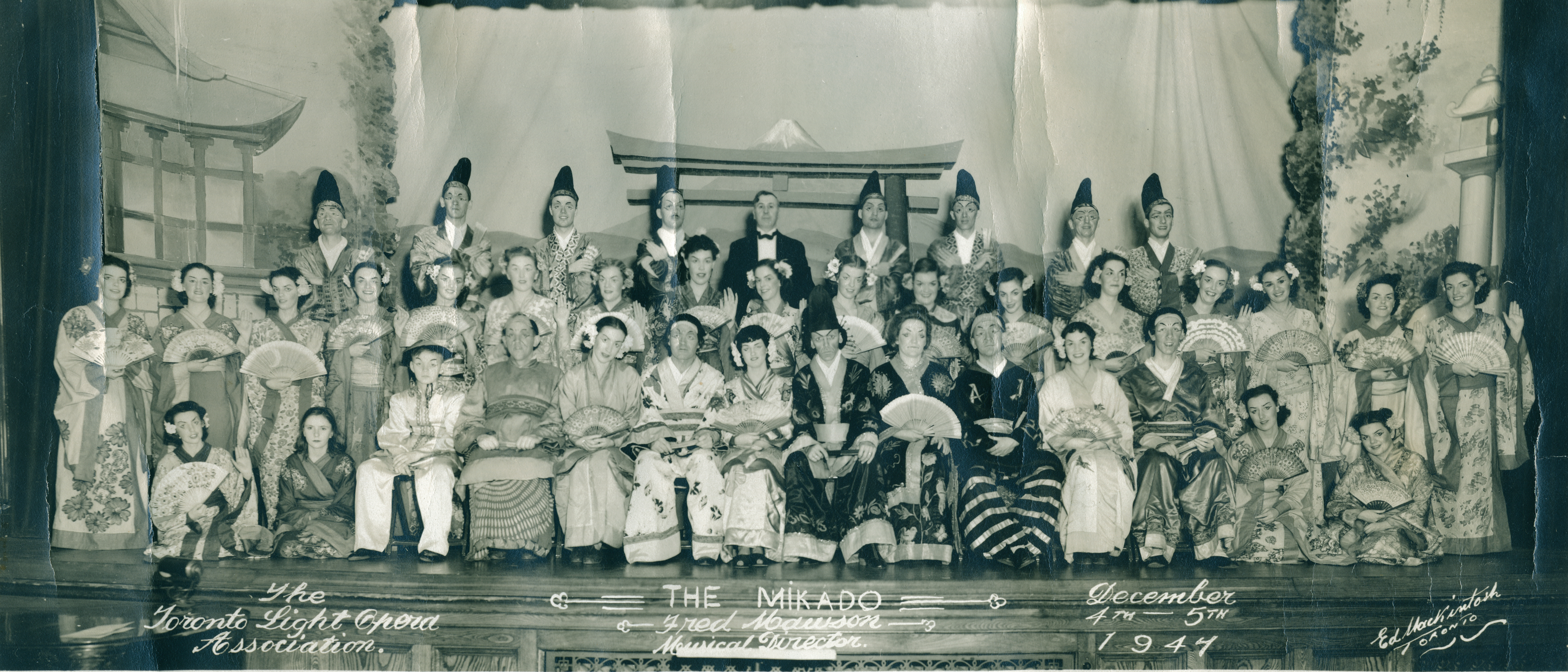
Cast of the 1947 production of The Mikado

Between 1942 and 1950 the company presented six different Gilbert and Sullivan operas. The piano accompaniment was by Winnifred Smith Stewart. The Association's productions between 1942 and 1950 were as follows:

- 1942: The first work to be presented was Trial by Jury, performed once in March and again in October 1942.
- 1943: H.M.S. Pinafore was next, presented twice in March and November 1943.
- 1945: Pinafore was staged in May 1945 at the Northern Vocational School auditorium.
- 1946: The Pirates of Penzance in March 1946 was at Danforth Technical School auditorium.
- 1947: A March presentation of Patience was at the Central School of Commerce auditorium.. This was followed in December by a production of The Mikado at Danforth Technical School auditorium.
- 1948: In 1948 two productions were presented: The Pirates of Penzance at Northern Vocational School auditorium, and Iolanthe that November at the Temple Theatre.
- 1949: A double production of Trial by Jury and H.M.S. Pinafore was presented in May, 1949 at Danforth Technical School In November The Yeoman of the Guard played at Bloor Collegiate Institute followed.
- 1950: The Gondoliers was presented in November 1950 at the Bloor Collegiate auditorium.

== Notable members ==
Howard Mawson, a bass baritone who played a role in many of the productions, went on to have a notable career in other operatic and dramatic organizations. He became a founding member of the Toronto branch of the Gilbert and Sullivan Society. His wife Elizabeth Mawson (née Burlington), a mezzo-soprano and a regular performer in the association, became known for her long-standing role as Marilla in the Anne of Green Gables – The Musical production at the Charlottetown Festival; she also performed with the Canadian Opera Company. Both Howard and Elizabeth would also later perform in the Eaton Operatic Society of Toronto. Alfred Kidney directed many of the company's productions and those of other light opera companies.
