= Alfred Kidney =

Actor

Alfred Kidney was an actor, singer, director, producer and dramatic coach who settled in Canada and was involved in a number of light opera and other theatre companies in Toronto, Ontario between 1929 and 1956.

== Career ==
Although an experienced actor, his most common role was as stage director. Groups in which his influence was felt included the Clef Choral Society, the Toronto Operatic Society, the Eaton Operatic Society, the Simpson Avenue United Church players, the St. Clair Opera Company, the Toronto Light Opera Association, the Lyric Operatic Society, and the Erskine Operatic Society.

Kidney also was involved in promoting light opera in the community, directing and coaching small amateur groups.

Kidney was best known for his productions of the works of Gilbert & Sullivan. He was praised by reviewers for his performances' authenticity. By 1947, the Toronto Star declared, "There is nobody more experienced hereabouts in Gilbert and Sullivan business."

Before settling in Toronto, Kidney had also performed in productions in Scotland and Ireland, beginning in about 1919.
