= Eaton's Ninth Floor Restaurant =

Landmark in Quebec, Canada

Coordinates: 45.50336°N 73.5710°W

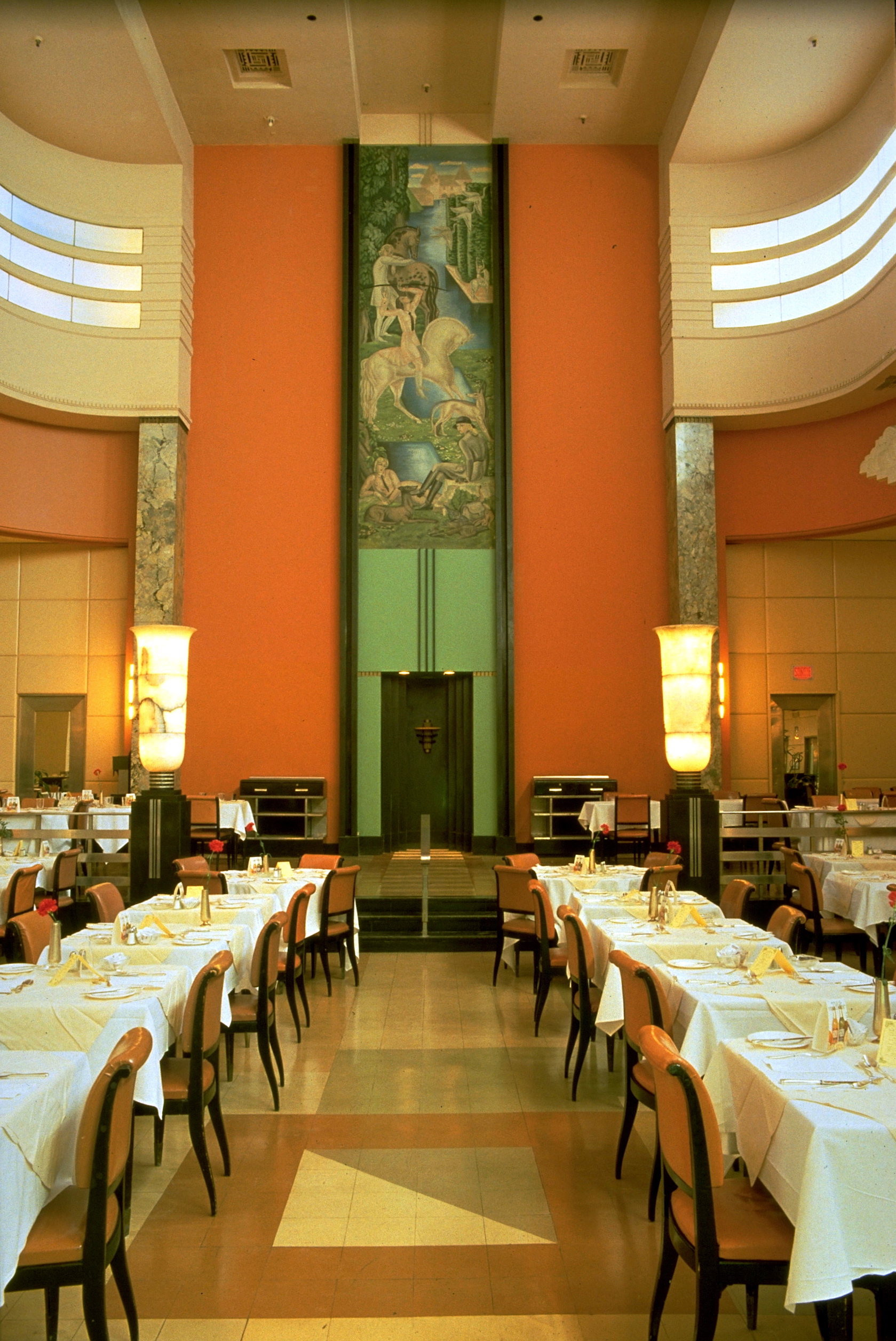
Ninth Floor Restaurant's dining hall and mural (photo circa 1987)

The Eaton's Ninth Floor Restaurant (also known as "The Ninth Floor" or "Le 9^{e}") was a popular eatery in Montreal, Quebec, Canada, operated by the Eaton's department store for 68 years, until its bankruptcy and closure in 1999. After being closed to the public for a quarter of a century, it was renovated and reopened as a special events venue with its peripheral Île de France Restaurant in 2024. It remains an Art Deco landmark, and a registered historical site.

== History ==
Lady Eaton, the wife of the multi-millionaire owner of the Eaton's department stores, gave her interpretation of "class and style" to the major Eaton's stores. In 1925 Eaton's purchased the three-storey Goodwin building at 677 Saint Catherine Street West and commissioned architects Ross & MacDonald to build it up to six storeys in 1927. The top three floors were added in 1930–1931. On January 26, 1931, Lady Eaton opened a large Art Deco restaurant on the 9th floor of the building. The restaurant was designed by architect Jacques Carlu, and the floor-to-ceiling mural at the back of the restaurant was created by his wife Natacha Carlu. It was patterned on dining hall of the transatlantic liner SS Île de France. The 9th floor corridor between the elevators and restaurant is also in the Art Deco style.

The waitresses and loyal customers of the restaurant were the subject of a 1998 National Film Board of Canada documentary, Les Dames du 9^{e} (The Ladies of the 9th).

=== Closure ===
Shortly following Eaton's bankruptcy, the restaurant closed on October 14, 1999. A bagpiper played "Amazing Grace" to mark its end. After remaining vacant, the 9th floor restaurant was given heritage status by the Quebec government. Plans for bringing the restaurant up to modern safety standards were drawn up by Fournier, Gersovitz, Moss et associés but never implemented.

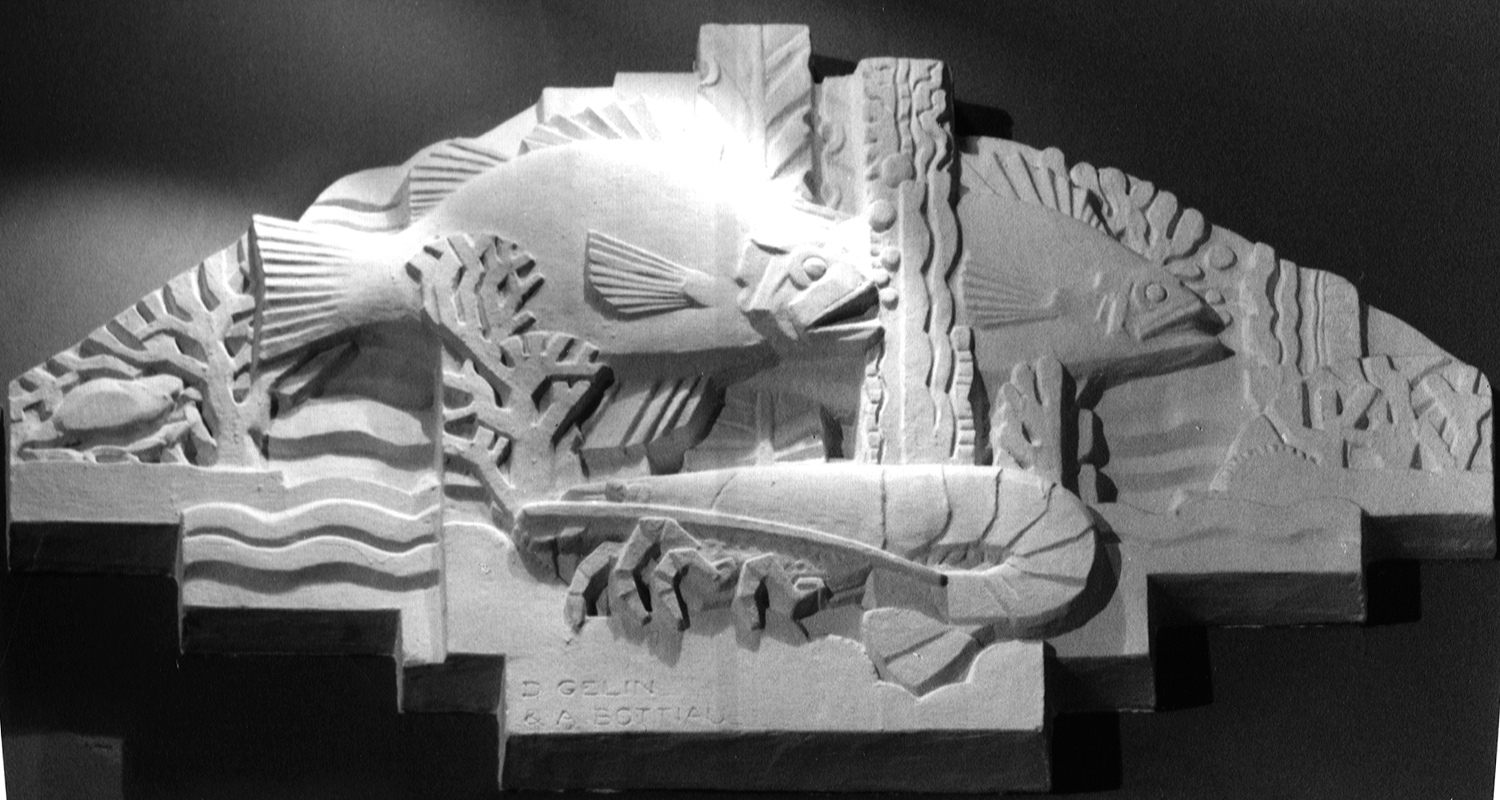
Bas-relief by Denis Gélin and Alfred-Alphonse Bottiau

=== Abandonment period ===
For nearly a quarter of a century, the former restaurant sat behind locked doors and was slowly deteriorating. The dining room, lobby and bathroom area remained, but the kitchen had been demolished for office space. The current owners, Ivanhoé Cambridge, the real estate subsidiary of the Caisse de dépôt et placement du Québec, had refused in the past to allow media or preservation groups to inspect the site. Urban explorers who trespassed the site in 2004, took photographs documenting its poor condition. On February 12, 2014, Heritage Montreal announced the restaurant was "under observation" due to the building's uncertain future. Adding to the uncertainty at the time, the former occupants of the site, Les Ailes de la Mode, went bankrupt and closed in 2014 (while later transformed into an extension of the Montreal Eaton Centre, there had been no plans for the ninth floor). Ivanhoé Cambridge last opened the floor to CTV News in 2015, though the future of the floor space remained uncertain. Throughout this time, the space was considered an endangered Art Deco landmark. In September 2019 preservation advocate Gérald McNichols Tétreault launched a petition to measure public interest in reviving the space. The building's owner reported that an estimated CA$15 million would be required to bring the space up to standards suitable for public use.

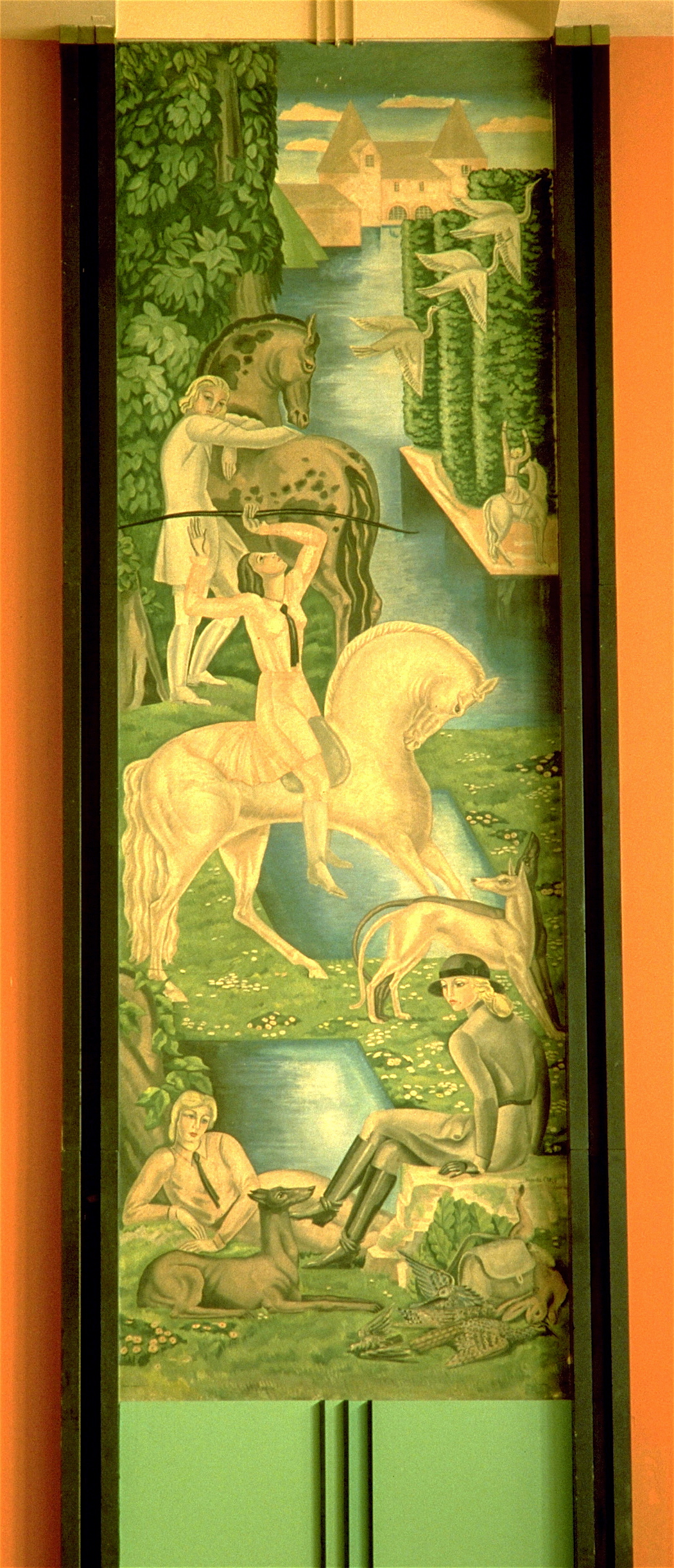
Mural by Natasha Carlu

=== 2024 reopening ===
In March 2023, Ivanhoe Cambridge, the owner of the Eaton Centre, announced the reopening of the iconic ninth floor by the end of the year. The heritage conservation firm, EVOQ Architecture, carried out the work to ensure the preservation of its heritage, while bringing it up to current standards. It was announced the re-imagined space would offer a restaurant, as well as a venue for shows and private events that can accommodate up to 500 people.

In August 2023, it was announced the multi-purpose space (containing six different areas, including a small restaurant) would be officially known as Le 9^{e}; however, the reopening was delayed until spring 2024.

On April 11, 2024, a soft reopening was held in the space by invitation only, with an expected opening date for the public by mid-May.

On May 17, 2024, the space officially opened to the public, featuring the upscale Restaurant Île-de-France. The original Eaton's restaurant space was repurposed as a general purpose venue hall, with tables and chairs for the new smaller restaurant in the outside windowed corridors.

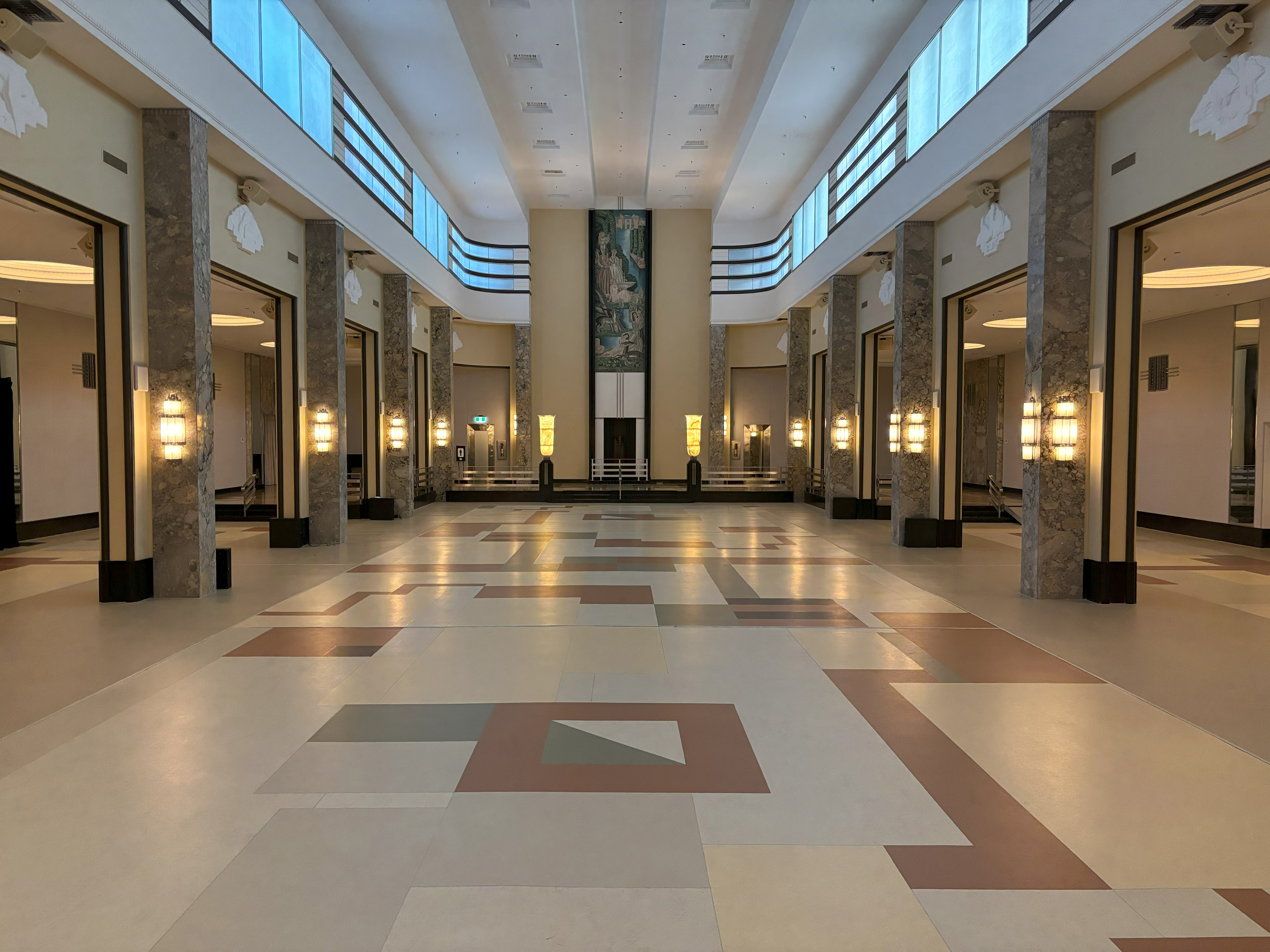
Eaton's Ninth Floor Restaurant pictured in 2024, now a general purpose venue hall.

== See also ==
- Complexe Les Ailes
- The Carlu (Toronto)

== Other sources ==
- Anderson, Carol and Mallinson, Katharine. Lunch with Lady Eaton: Inside the Dining Rooms of a Nation, Toronto: ECW Press, 2004. ISBN 978-1550226508
- Cohen-Rose, Sandra. Northern Deco: Art Deco Architecture in Montreal. Montreal: Corona Publishers, 1996 Sandra Cohen-Rose. ISBN 0-919631-06-1
- Martin, Catherine. The Ladies of the 9th Floor. 60 minute film. Winner of the 1998 Telefilm Canada prize for short and medium length films.
