= Howard Mawson =

Canadian opera singer

Howard Allan Mawson (23 May 1920 – 28 March 2004) was a Canadian bass-baritone, particularly known for his performances in the operettas of Gilbert & Sullivan. Born in Toronto, he was married to the Canadian mezzo-soprano, Elizabeth Mawson, and performed with her on many occasions. He died in his native city at the age of 83.

== Life and career ==
Mawson was born in Toronto and studied singing at the Hambourg Conservatory of Music and later at the Royal Conservatory of Music in Toronto. He was also a graduate of the Ontario College of Art. With his father Frederick Mawson, a Toronto choirmaster, he co-founded the Toronto Light Opera Association, in which he played principal roles. He also sang with the Eaton Operatic Society and performed in light operas at the Stratford Festival from 1960 until 1965 as well appearing in minor roles in the Canadian Opera Company's 1966 productions of La traviata and Healey Willan's opera Deirdre.

However, he was particularly known for his performances of Gilbert & Sullivan roles, several of which he performed live on CBC Television. His first role was that of Dick Deadeye in Vaughan Road Collegiate's 1937 production of H.M.S. Pinafore. He was also a founding member of the Toronto Gilbert & Sullivan Society and appeared in many of its productions from 1967 until 1992, including the society's first production, The Mikado (as Koko), and its last production, The Pirates of Penzance (as the Major General).

Mawson was married to Elizabeth Mawson (1927–2008), a Canadian mezzo-soprano and fellow student at the Hambourg Conservatory. The couple appeared together many times, including the 1960 production of H.M.S Pinafore directed by Tyrone Guthrie at the Phoenix Theatre in New York City—he as Dick Deadeye and she as Hebe. For many years they also sang as soloists in the choir of St. Andrew's United Church in Toronto.

In his later years Mawson suffered from Alzheimer's disease. He died in Toronto on 28 March 2004, survived by his wife Elizabeth and their two sons, Allan and Douglas.
