= T. J. Crawford =

Thomas J. Crawford, known as T. J. Crawford, (11 June 1877 – 6 July 1955) was a Scottish-born Canadian organist, conductor, composer, and music educator. He held organist posts in Germany and England prior to relocating to Canada in 1922. He held several organist posts in churches in Toronto, and was conductor of the Eaton Operatic Society. He served as president of the Royal Canadian College of Organists in 1929, and taught on the faculty of The Royal Conservatory of Music from 1922 until his death in 1955. His compositional output included sacred music, orchestral music, works for organ and piano, songs, and two children's operas.

== Life and career ==
Thomas J. Crawford was born in Barrhead, Scotland on 11 June 1877. His parents had religious and political differences; with his Scottish businessman father supporting the Liberal Party and his English mother supporting the Tories. He began working as an organist in 1890 at the age of 13 at a Scottish congregational church. His early music studies were in Glasgow where he studied with organ and music theory with Harry Sandiford Turner and Otto Schweitzer.

Crawford earned two diplomas from the Royal College of Organists: ARCO (1892) and FRCO (1902). The years between these two latter degrees he studied at the Leipzig Conservatory where he was a pupil of Carl Reinecke and Paul Homeyer. Through Reinecke he became acquainted with Johannes Brahms. While in Germany he was organist at All Saints' Church, Leipzig from 1894–1898. He earned a bachelor of music degree from Durham University in 1902.

In 1898 Crawford returned to England when he was appointed assistant organist at Westminster Abbey under Frederick Bridge for a period of seven years. He held several posts in England in the pursuing years; including organist/choirmaster positions at Church of Holy Trinity, Eltham (1898-1899), St Paul's Church, Camden Square (1899-1902), and St Michael's Church, Chester Square. Sources indicated that he was appointed to organist posts at the latter church in 1902 and again in 1911 but are unclear as to the length of duration at this church.

In 1922 Crawford immigrated to Canada to take a position on the faculty at the Toronto Conservatory (later The Royal Conservatory of Music). He concurrently accepted a post as organist and choirmaster at St. Paul's, Bloor Street where he served from 1922-1931. He was organist choirmaster at Church of the Holy Trinity in 1932, and then served as organist/choirmaster Timothy Eaton Memorial Church from 1933 until 1946 when he decided to retire from church work. In 1941 the Royal Canadian College of Organists (RCCO) formally celebrated Crawford at an event organized to acknowledge his 50th year as an organist and choirmaster He served a term as president of the RCCO in 1929, and was known for his annual contributions of poetry to the RCCO conferences. He also worked as a choral and opera conductor in Toronto; serving as music director of the Eaton Choral Society (1925-1931), Eaton Operatic Society (1931-1947), and Victoria Music Club (1927-1942).

Crawford became a naturalized Canadian in 1928. He was the author of the music book Keyboard Harmony and Transposition; published in 1952 and again in 1966. He was married to Gertrude Ramsden Crawford. They had four children; William, Thomas, Jane, and Barbara. He came out of retirement late in life to work as organist at St Andrew's Church, Barrie in 1954-1955.

He died on 6 July 1955 in Barrie, Ontario. He had suffered serious injuries in a car accident about a week before his death, and was still on the faculty of The Royal Conservatory of Music at the time that he died.

As a composer he wrote works for organ, piano, and voice; most of which were sacred works. His orchestral piece Lipsia Suite was given its premiere in Leipzig under the baton of his teacher Reinecke in the 1890s, and was later performed in London at a concert at The Crystal Palace conducted by August Manns. He also wrote the children's operas Dot's Dream and Vi's Christmas Party. The National Library of Canada holds several of his manuscripts.

== Partial list of works ==
- Piano Trio (189?)
- Scottish Suite for strings (189?)
- Toccata in F for organ (1904)
- In a Great Cathedral for organ (1951)
- Variations on an Original Theme for orchestra
