= The Carlu =

Coordinates: 43.660929°N 79.383302°W

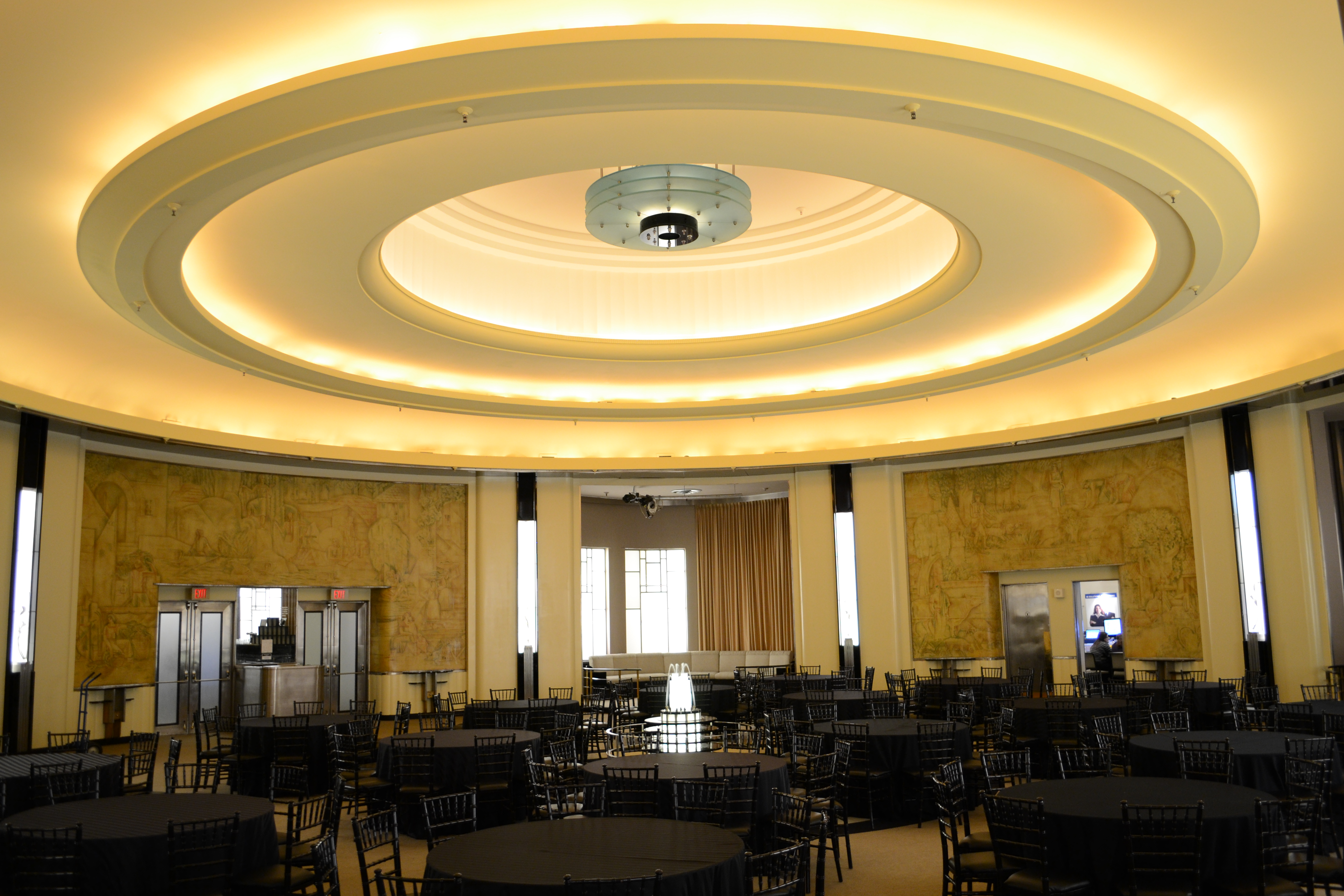
- The Round Room
- Interactive map of The Carlu
- Location: Toronto, Ontario, Canada

History
- Built: 1930

Site notes
- Area: 50,000 sq. ft.
- Architect: Jacques Carlu
- Website: www.thecarlu.com

National Historic Site of Canada
- Official name: Eaton's 7th Floor Auditorium and Round Room
- Designated: 1983

Ontario Heritage Act
- Official name: T. Eaton Co. College Street Store
- Designated: 1975

The Carlu is an historic event space in Toronto, Ontario, Canada. Opened in 1930 and known as the eponymous "Eaton's Seventh Floor", the venue was restored and reopened in 2003, renamed for its original architect. The Carlu is one of Toronto's best examples of Art Moderne architecture. The venue is owned by restaurant firm Oliver & Bonacini.

== History ==
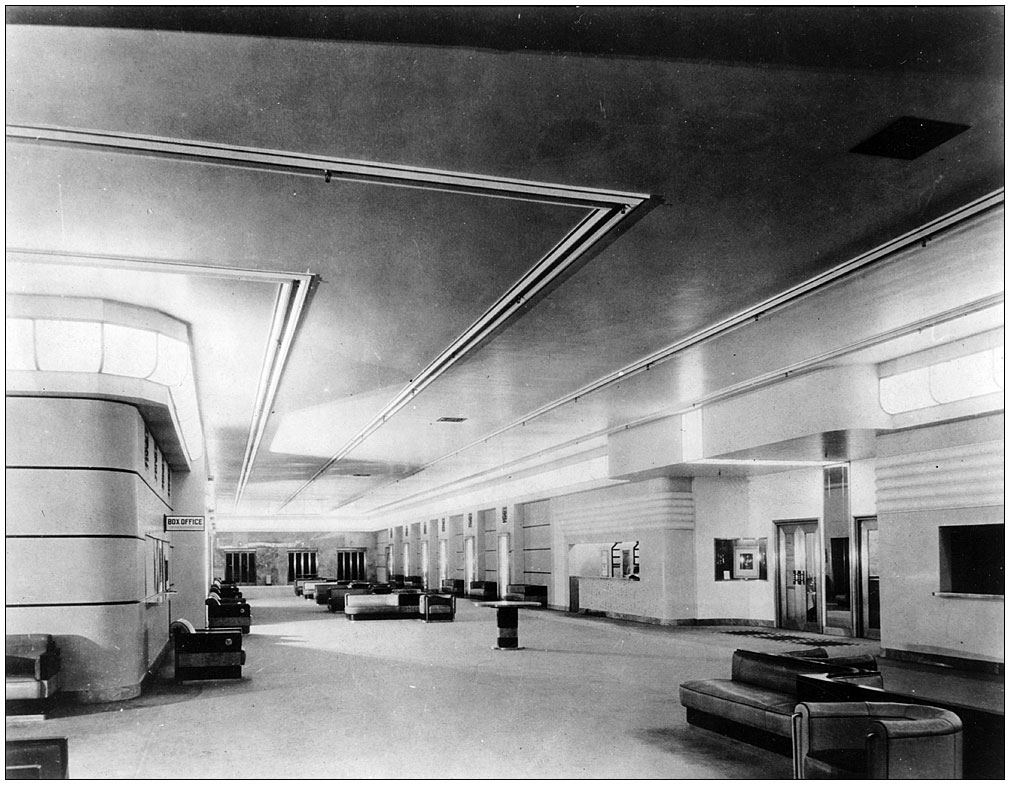
The Grand Foyer at the Eaton's Seventh Floor in 1931. The floor was designed by French architect Jacques Carlu.

In 1930, the Eaton's department store chain, at the time Canada's dominant retailer, opened "Eaton's College Street", an imposing Art moderne store at the intersection of Yonge Street and College Street. The matriarch of the Eaton family, Lady Eaton, was a member of Eaton's board of directors, and the Eaton's restaurants were one of her responsibilities. She retained the noted French architect Jacques Carlu to design the seventh floor of the edifice, which was to contain the 1300-seat Eaton Auditorium, the Round Room restaurant, lounges and a private dining room. All of the facilities were to be connected by a long foyer, designed in the style of the ocean liners of the day. Between 1931 and 1965, the theatre was home to the Eaton Operatic Society.

=== Broadcast centre ===
The newly opened Auditorium was used for radio broadcasts on CKGW during holidays and special events. During Christmastime, one could hear the Cassavant organ being played by Frederick C. Silvester or a May Day organ recital by Harold Frost. It also played motion pictures accompanied by organ music (again broadcast over CKGW), for example showing Snow White in April 1931 with organ music by Kathleen Stokes.

=== Later history ===
With the opening of the Toronto Eaton Centre in 1977, Eaton's College Street was closed to make way for the new Eaton's flagship store at Yonge Street and Dundas Street. The store was sold to new owners, and was rechristened College Park.

Although the new owners had originally agreed to preserve the Seventh Floor, they eventually determined that its preservation and restoration was not financially feasible, and they applied for a demolition permit to convert the entire floor to office space. After a lengthy court battle with the City of Toronto, the Court of Appeal for Ontario ruled in 1986 that the 1975 designation of the building under the Ontario Heritage Act protected the Seventh Floor from demolition. Despite several changes in building ownership, and the efforts of local heritage advocates, the Seventh Floor was sealed off for 27 years and allowed to deteriorate; although it was protected by law, there was no legal obligation to use or restore it.

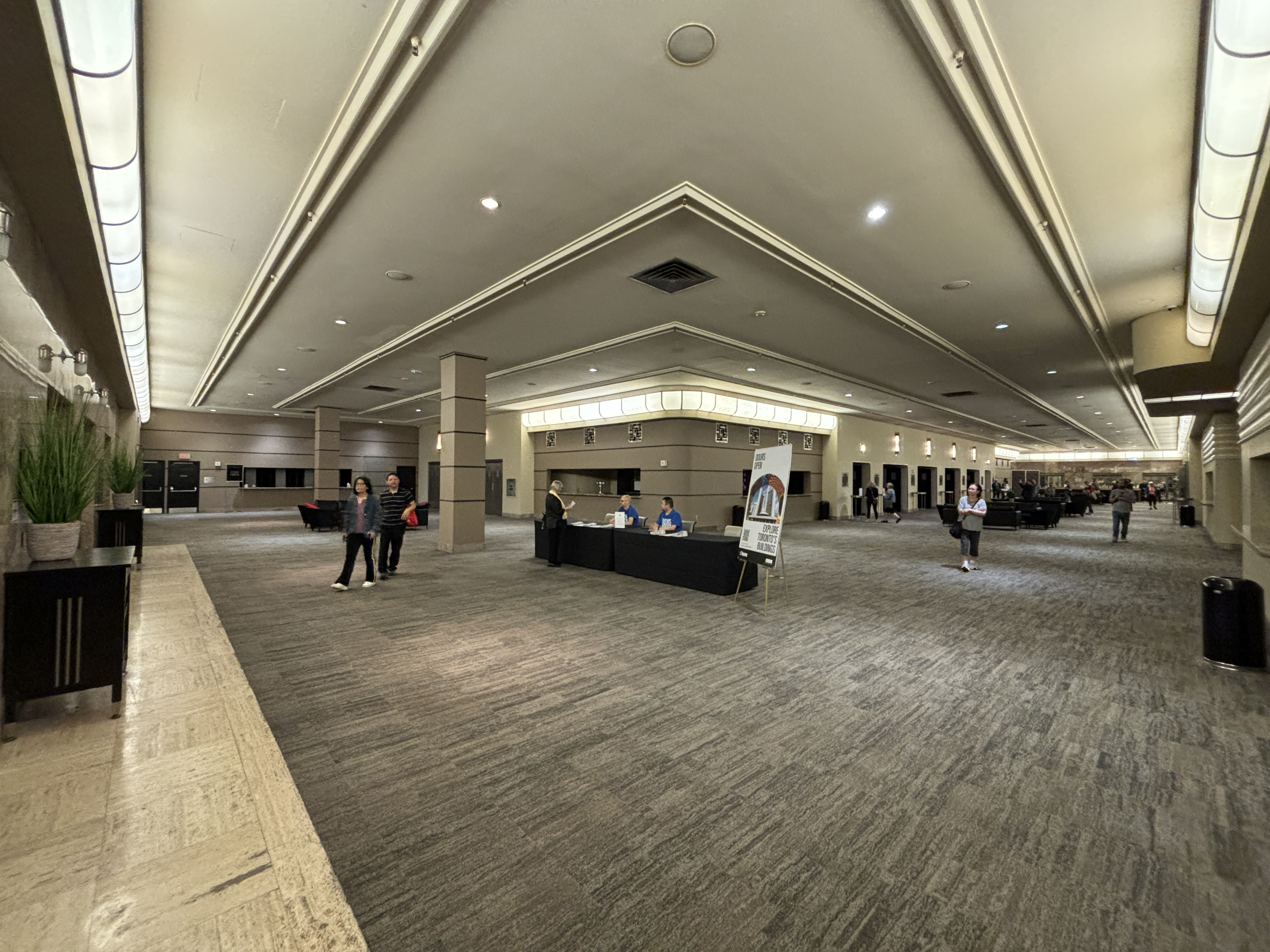
After restoration work was completed, the floor reopened as The Carlu event venue in 2003.

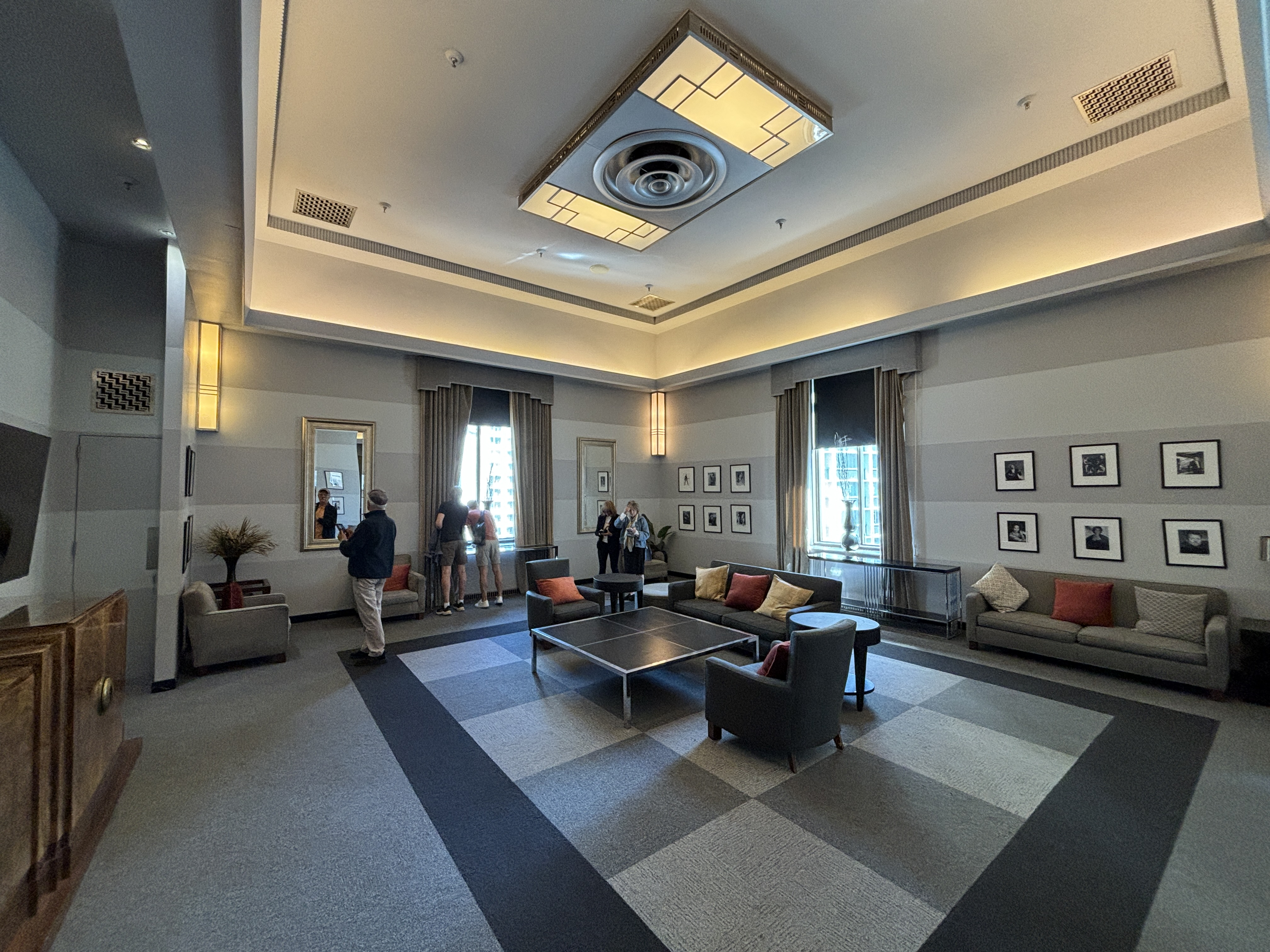
Private Dining Lounge in The Carlu

The Seventh Floor was eventually restored, after years of neglect, and was reopened in 2003 to much acclaim as "The Carlu" event venue. The restoration process began in 2001 with a $2,500,000 budget and no tenant. But later that year, new tenants Jeffry Roick and Mark Robert came into the picture with an increased budget. Scott Weir of ERA Architects and Hadi Khouzam of WZMH Architects led the restoration of the space.

The raked floors were removed from the auditorium to return the space's original movable seating. Other modifications had to be made to the auditorium so that modern acoustical equipment could be used. Even the original Lalique fountain, which had long been believed lost, was restored to its place at the centre of the Round Room. The large kitchen in the Carlu was replaced with two smaller ones in different areas of the seventh floor. This made room for a new entertainment space to be added, the Sky Room. The venue's new name was chosen to honour the architect that had originally designed the space.

Upgrades were also needed in the HVAC system. These updates were done without damaging or removing the original vents from the space. In 2008, The Clipper Rooms were re-envisioned and renovated by HGTV designer Sarah Richardson.

Today, the space acts as a special events venue. Concerts, dinners, galas, weddings, fashion shows and the presentation of the annual Polaris Music Prize are among the events that take place at the Carlu.

== The facility ==
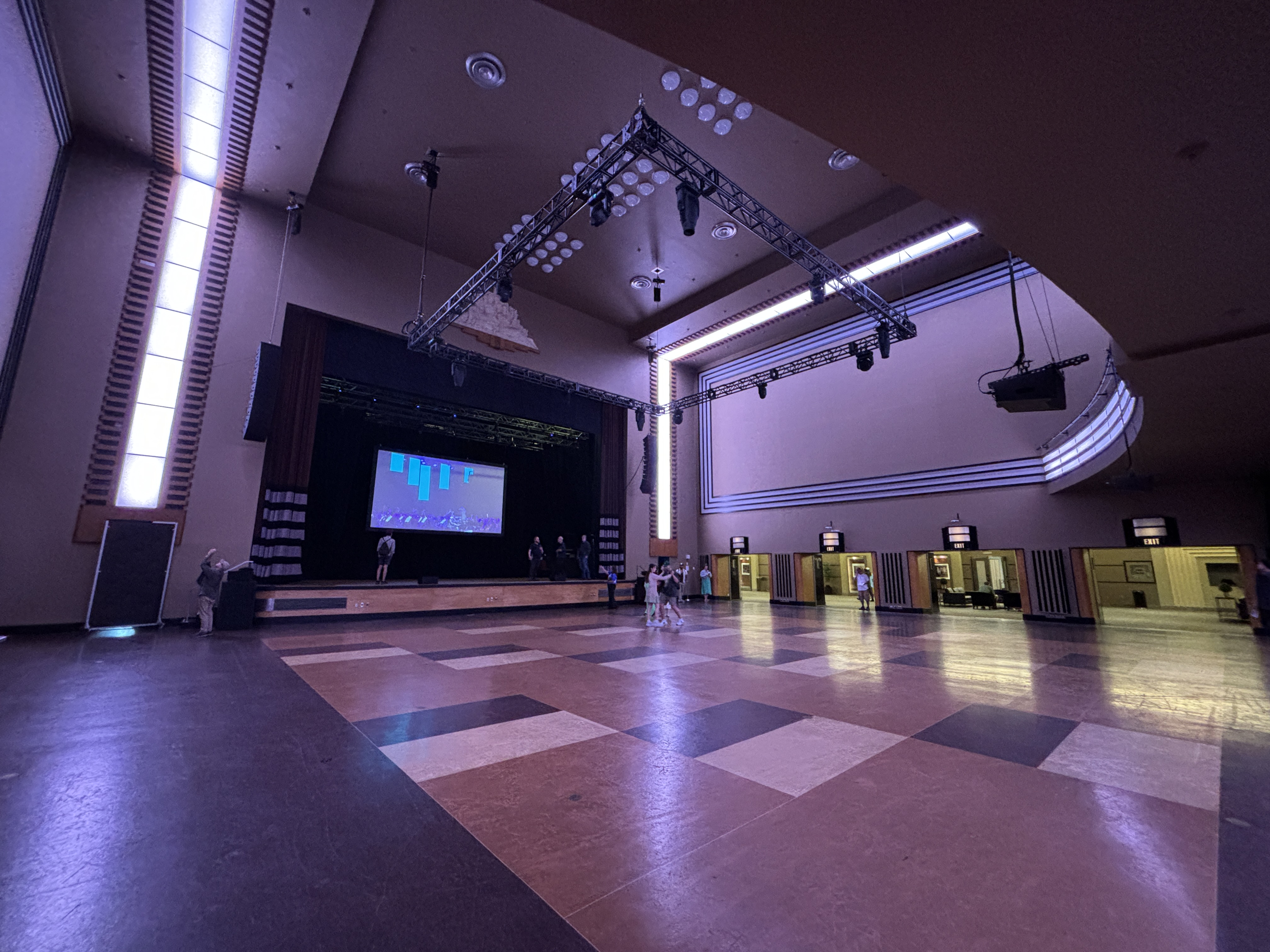
Auditorium

Itself a highly regarded work of Art Moderne, the Eaton's Seventh Floor was at the heart of Toronto's cultural life for many years. The Auditorium played host to the major performers of its day, including Billie Holiday, Duke Ellington and Frank Sinatra. The first performance of the National Ballet of Canada was on the stage of the Eaton Auditorium. Glenn Gould, fond of the Auditorium's excellent acoustics, used the hall for a number of his recordings.

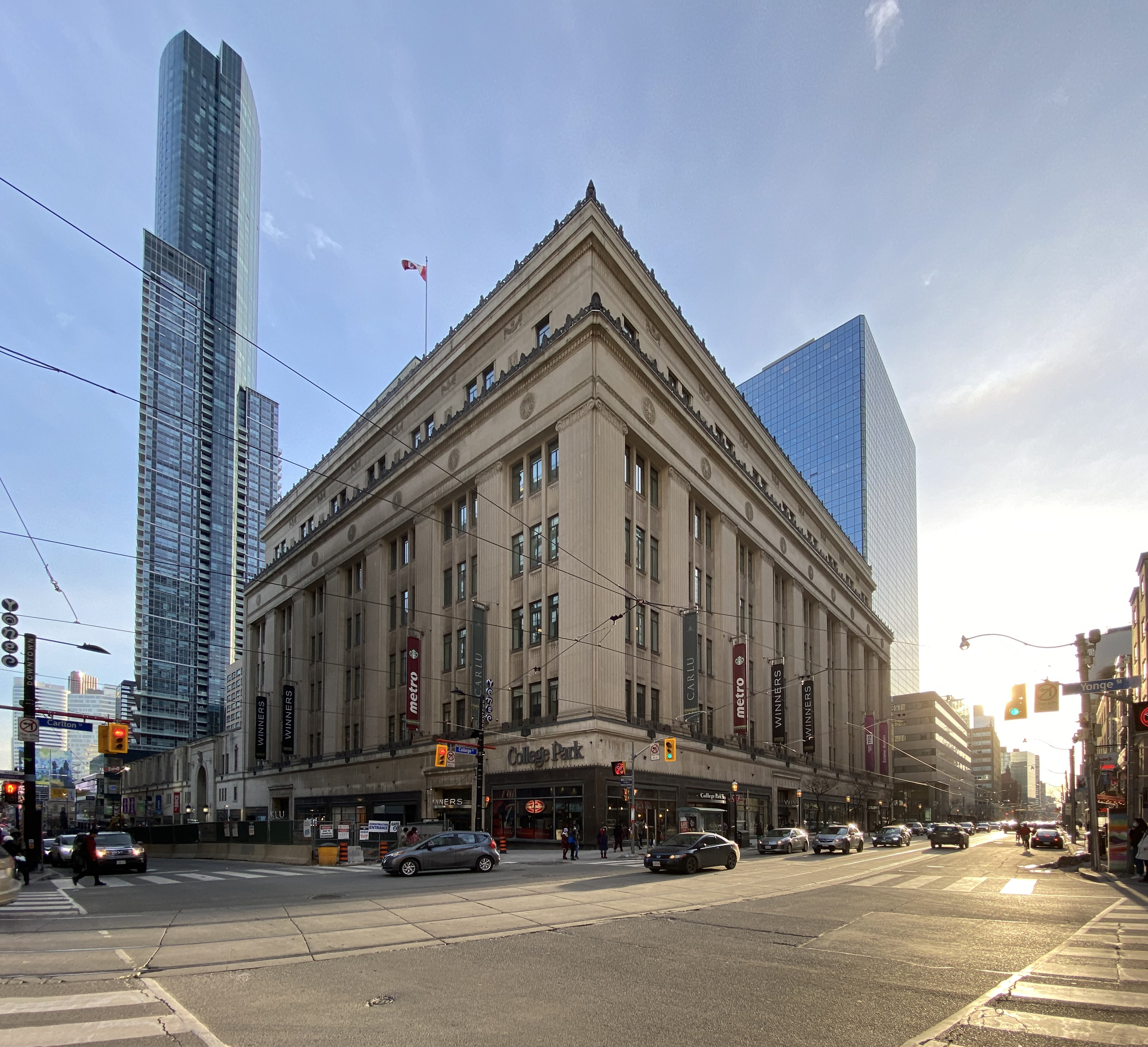
The Carlu is housed on the seventh floor of College Park, located at College and Yonge Street.

The Round Room was, as the name suggests, a circular room, with circular mouldings in the domed ceiling and recessed alcoves in the corners. At the centre of the room stood a Lalique fountain, lit from below. Carlu was responsible for all aspects of the dining room's design, from the lighting fixtures to the Royal Worcester china, the stemware, and the waitresses' black uniforms. Carlu's wife, Anne Carlu (née Peckard 1895-1972), designed the murals on the walls, depicting various scenes of pastoral life. For years, the Round Room was one of the most elegant places to dine in Toronto.

Inside of the Carlu, monel, a steel-nickel alloy, was used for many accents. The monel can be found in the light fixtures, vents, doors and the fountain. It helps to play up the sleek lines in the space and the Art Moderne style. Marble panelling was also used at both ends of the foyer. The colour palette for the Carlu was taken from the marble and spread throughout most of the floor.

=== Heritage protection ===
The entire building at 444 Yonge St. is designated under Part IV of the Ontario Heritage Act since 1975. The City also holds a Heritage Easement Agreement, registered on January 10, 2012 as Instrument #: AT2915699, on the property. The venue itself is listed as a National Historic Site of Canada since 1983.

== See also ==
- Eaton's Ninth Floor Restaurant in Montreal
