= Jacques Carlu =

French architect and designer (1890–1976)

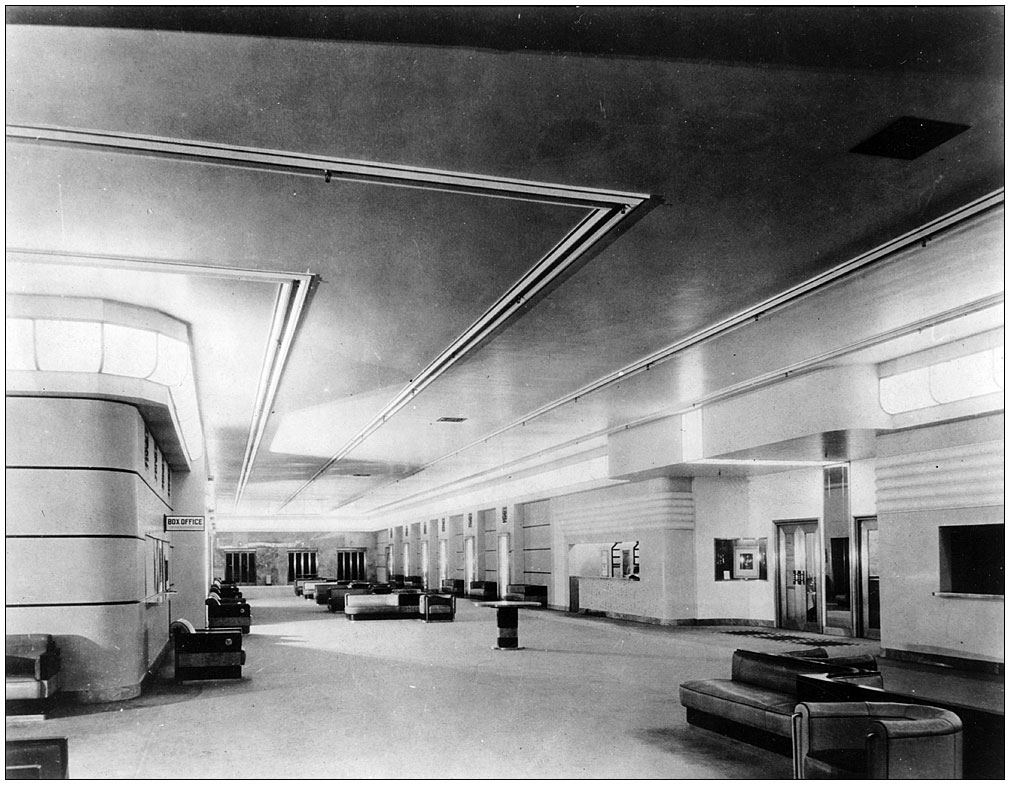
Eaton Auditorium; Seventh Floor

Jacques Carlu (7 April 1890 Bonnières-sur-Seine – 3 December 1976 Paris) was a French architect and designer, working mostly in Art Deco style, active in France, Canada, and in the United States.

== Biography ==
Through the 1910s Carlu studied on site with British city planner Thomas Hayton Mawson, Pittsburgh architects Palmer and Hornbostel, and in the Paris studios of Victor Laloux. After winning the Prix de Rome in 1919, Carlu takes a number of academic positions in quick succession: director of the Ecole des Beaux-Arts at Fontainebleau, professor of architecture at the Massachusetts Institute of Technology from 1924 to 1934, and a position with the Beaux Arts Institute of Design in New York. With intensive transatlantic travel, Carlu becomes a sort of ambassador of Streamline Moderne style.

His most famous building is likely the Palais de Chaillot, Trocadéro, near the Eiffel Tower, which was designed for the Exposition Internationale des Arts et Techniques dans la Vie Moderne (1937). The building's long wings now serve as museum space, and it features sculptural groups on the attic by Raymond Delamarre, Carlo Sarrabezolles and Alfred Bottiau.

His other buildings include the 1957 NATO HQ (see of the Secretary General) in Paris (until 1967), now Université Paris-Dauphine. Among his important interiors are the 1930 Eaton Auditorium in Toronto (now known as "The Carlu"), the 1943 French Nationality Room at the University of Pittsburgh's Cathedral of Learning, and other venues.

Carlu is buried at the Passy Cemetery with his spouse Anne. He was the brother of French graphic designer Jean Carlu.

Carlu was married to little-known artist Anne Carlu (née Peckard 1895-1972). A mural of Anne's resides in the hall of the United Nations, Palais des Nations, in Geneva Switzerland.
