= Frank Oldfield =

Frank Oldfield (c. 1882 –December 19, 1956) was an English-born Canadian baritone.

== Biography ==
The son of Joseph and Agnes Oldfield, Frank was born in Ulverston, Lancashire, England. He immigrated to Canada in 1911.

One of the earliest recording artists from the city of Toronto, Oldfield was under contract with Pathé Records (PR) by 1919. PR did not make these recordings in Canada, but instead used studios in New York City and London. Some of the songs he recorded for PR included "I Love You Canada", "O Canada, Our Fathers Land of Old", "Be British", "Sussex by the Sea", "There’s a Land", "Bedouin Love Song", "The Farmer’s Pride", "The Floral Dance", "The Palms, and "Nearer My God to Thee".

Oldfield also made recordings for His Master's Voice, and Berliner Gramophone. Some of the songs he recorded for HMV included "Billy Jones", "Down Texas Way", "Give Me the Open Road", and "On the Road to Mandalay". In addition to his work as a recording artist, he performed as a concert baritone throughout Canada. He appeared in oratorios; such as a soloist in Handel's Messiah. He was the bass soloist in Handel's Judas Maccabaeus with the Eaton Choral Society in 1930. He was also employed as a church vocalist at Parkdale United Church in Toronto for many years.

Oldfield died at Toronto Western Hospital on December 19, 1956.
