= Royal Canadian College of Organists =

Royal Canadian College of Organists Coat of Arms

The Royal Canadian College of Organists (RCCO), founded in 1909, is a national association of organists and church musicians in Canada, with 28 centres from Victoria, British Columbia to Charlottetown, Prince Edward Island. The National Office is in Toronto.

The chief aim of the college is to promote a high standard of organ playing, choral directing, church music and composition. To this end, it holds examinations and grants diplomas, encourages musical events such as workshops and recitals, commissions new works, affords opportunities for discussion, and provides advice on being a professional musician. The college holds an annual summer convention. Recent conventions were held in Montreal QC (2017), Calgary AB (2018) and Halifax NS (2019). The college is registered as a charitable organization in Canada.

== History ==
On 27 October 1909, a resolution recognising "the importance of establishing a college of organists, similar to that of England, in Canada" was passed at the Conservatory of Music in Brantford, Ontario and in December of that year, the Canadian Guild of Organists was founded. In 1920 the Guild was renamed as the Canadian College of Organists, and in 1959 it was granted the prefix Royal, in recognition of the fiftieth anniversary of the college.

== Publications ==
From October 1968 to June 2009, The American Organist, published monthly by the American Guild of Organists (AGO), was the official journal of the RCCO as well as of the AGO. In September 2009, because of changes in United States Postal Service regulations, the RCCO began to publish its own official journal. Its quarterly newsletter Organ Canada/Orgue Canada was redesigned as a glossy bimonthly publication, with the purpose of "celebrating excellence in Canadian organ building, performance, composition, and education".

The American Organist, while no longer the official journal of the RCCO, remains available to members by subscription, along with a selection of other choral and organ publications, at group rates.

Since 2000 the RCCO has also published a range of choral and organ music by Canadian composers.

== Diplomas ==
The college grants several levels of accreditation, for which it holds examinations annually:

- Colleague Diploma (CRCCO)
- Associate Diploma (ARCCO)
- Fellow Diploma (FRCCO)
- Professional Diploma in Choral Conducting (Ch.RCCO)
- Service Playing certificate
- Worship Accompanist certificate
- Choir Training certificate

The college offers printed materials and recordings on topics including organ study, choir training, preparation for examinations, commissioning of compositions, purchase of organs, employment and ethics. It holds composition competitions and organ playing competitions, and awards prizes and scholarships.

== Some notable members ==
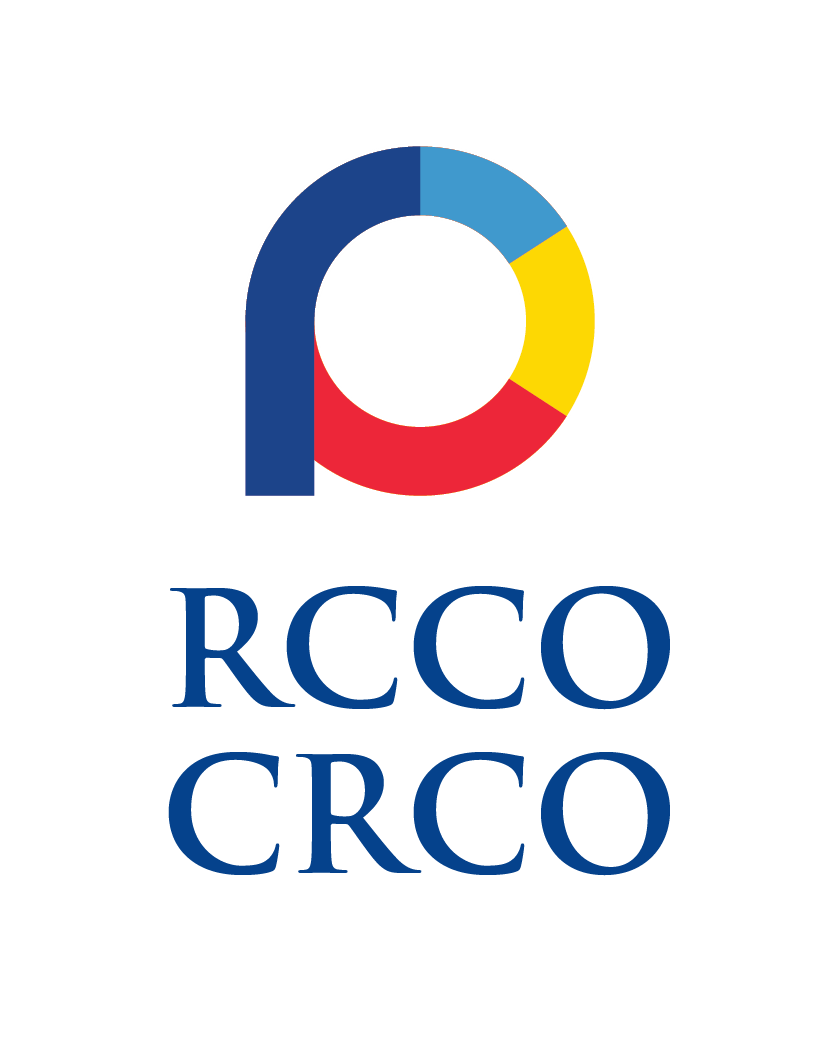
The official logo of the Royal Canadian College of Organists

- Healey Willan, President 1922–1923, 1933–1935
- Sir Ernest MacMillan, President 1927–1928
- W. H. Hewlett, President 1928–1929
- T. J. Crawford, President 1929
- Alfred Whitehead, President 1930–1931, 1935–1937
- Herbert Sanders, President 1932–1933
- Paul Ambrose, President 1939–1940
- Charles Peaker, President 1941–1943
- Eric Rollinson, President 1943–1945
- Graham George, President 1972–1974
- Gerald Bales, President 1980–1982
- H. Hugh Bancroft
- Eric Robertson
