= SS Île de France =

French ocean liner in service 1927–1959

- Île de France at sea

History
- Name: Île de France (1927-1958); Furansu Maru (1958-1959); Claridon (1959); Furansu Maru (1959)
- Owner: Compagnie Générale Transatlantique
- Port of registry: Le Havre, France
- Route: Le Havre – Plymouth (later Southampton) – New York
- Builder: Ateliers et Chantiers de Saint-Nazaire Penhoët, Saint-Nazaire, France
- Laid down: 1925
- Launched: 14 March 1926
- Christened: 14 March 1926
- Maiden voyage: 22 June 1927
- In service: 1927
- Out of service: 1959
- Identification: Official number: 173054
- Fate: Scrapped in Osaka, Japan, 1960–1961

General characteristics
- Type: Ocean liner
- Tonnage: 43,153 GRT, 21,923 NRT (1927); 44,356 GRT, 21,494 NRT (1949)
- Length: 791 ft (241.1 m)
- Beam: 91 ft (27.7 m)
- Speed: 23.5 knots (43.5 km/h; 27.0 mph)
- Capacity: 1,786 total passengers: 537 First class; 603 Second class; 646 Third class

SS Île de France (literally Island of France in English) was a French luxury ocean liner that plied the prestigious transatlantic route between Europe and New York from 1927 through to 1958. She was built in Saint-Nazaire for the Compagnie Générale Transatlantique (or CGT, also known as the "French Line"), and named after the region around Paris known as "Île-de-France". Launched on 14 March 1926, she commenced her maiden voyage on 22 June 1927, as the first major ocean liner built after World War I, and the first ever to be decorated almost entirely in modern Art Deco style. Though she was neither the largest ship nor the fastest, she was considered the most beautifully decorated built by CGT, becoming the favored ship of the interwar era among the young, wealthy and fashionable elites.

When World War II broke out she briefly served as a troop ship before all her luxurious fittings were removed for conversion into a prison ship. After the war Île de France resumed transatlantic operations. In 1956 she played a key role in rescuing passengers from Andrea Doria after the latter ship's fatal collision with Stockholm off Nantucket, Massachusetts. Her last public appearance was starring as a doomed ocean liner in the 1959 movie The Last Voyage, filmed while waiting to be scrapped in Japan. She was partially flooded and the actors filmed their scenes as if she were sinking. She was subsequently refloated and scrapped.

== Construction and launch ==
Île de France was part of a four ship agreement between the Compagnie Générale Transatlantique (CGT) and the French government dating to November 1912. It called for the construction of passenger-mail ships, with the first named Paris and the second Île de France. World War I delayed construction until the 1920s, with Paris being launched in 1916 and not entering service until 1921. After her keel was laid down in 1925, Île de France was launched on 14 March 1926 at the shipyard Ateliers et Chantiers de Saint-Nazaire Penhoët (or Chantiers de Penhoët) in Saint-Nazaire on the west coast of France, and was greeted by thousands of government and company officials, workers, press and French citizens. Fourteen months of fitting-out followed; she left the yard in 1927 to begin sea trials on 29 May and departed on her maiden voyage on 22 June.

== Interior ==
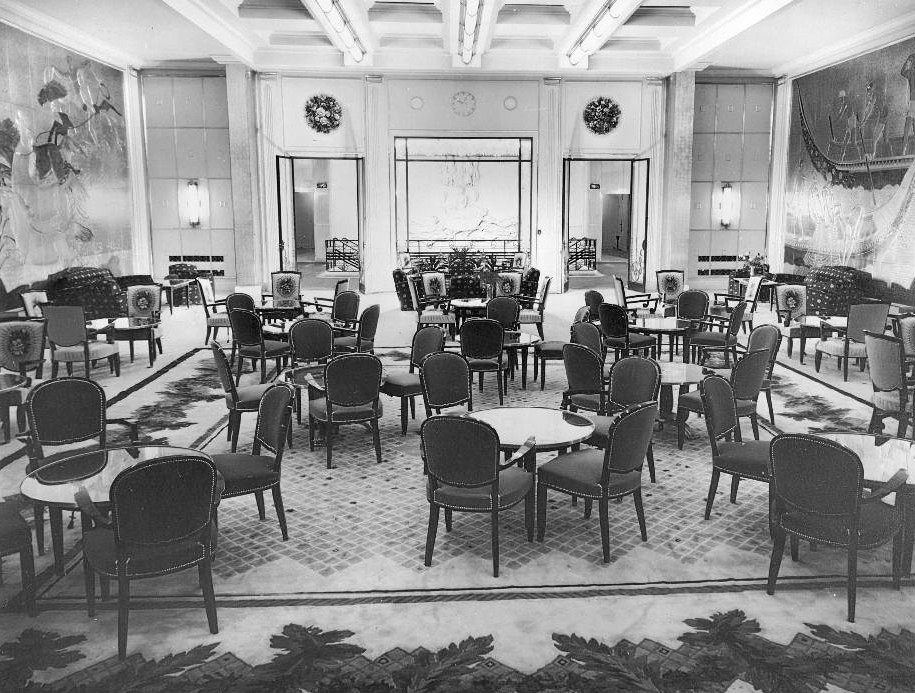
The liner's Grand Salon as it appeared in the 1950s, following post-World War II remodeling

In 1926, the CGT had released an elaborate booklet with a gold cover devoted entirely to promoting the company's new ship. The illustrations depicted huge and elegant but modern public rooms with female passengers carrying feather fans and smoking cigarettes, and passengers being led around the uncluttered sun deck.

The interiors were designed by architect Pierre Patout, one of the founders of the Art Deco style.

The trend in ship interior design up to this point, including Mauretania, Olympic and Imperator, all had interiors that celebrated various styles of the past, and which could be found in the most expensive, upper-class manors or châteaux on land. In contrast, the interiors of Île de France represented something new: for the first time, a ship's passenger spaces had been designed not to reproduce decorative styles of the past, but to celebrate the progressive style of the present, with a degree of modernity unlike any previous ship. The first-class dining room's decor was simple, in contrast to past styles which had vied with each other regarding extent of decoration and detail. The first class dining room was also the largest of any ship existing at the time, rising through three decks high with a grand staircase as its entrance.

In addition to the luxurious dining room, there was also a grand foyer that was open to four decks, a chapel in the neo-gothic style, a shooting gallery, an elaborate gymnasium, and even a merry-go-round for the younger passengers. Every cabin, including the least luxurious, had beds instead of bunks. Even many of the chairs had been given new designs.

Subsequently, planners from major liner companies visited the French vessel while designing their own upcoming passenger ships.

== Maiden voyage and early career ==
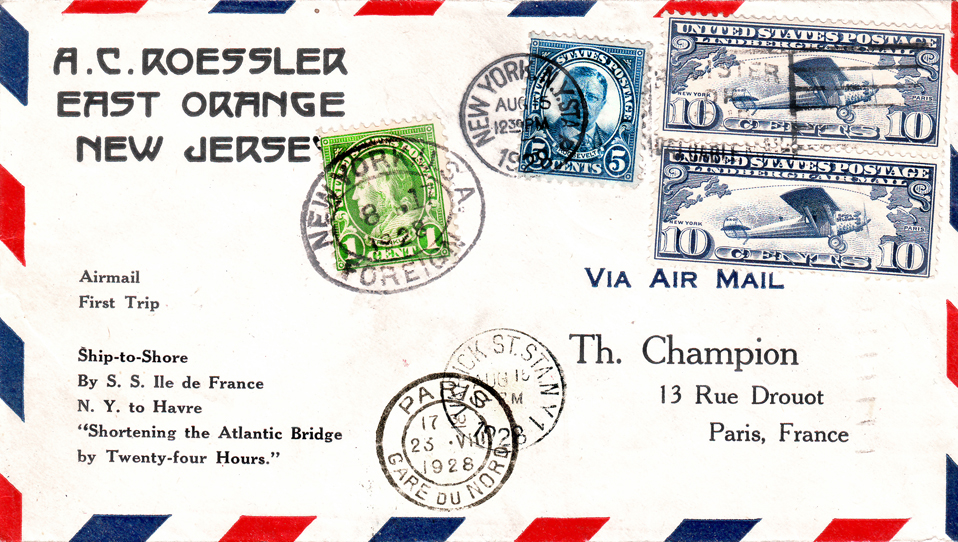
Flown cover carried on the first US to Europe "catapult" air mail from Île de France at sea on August 23, 1928

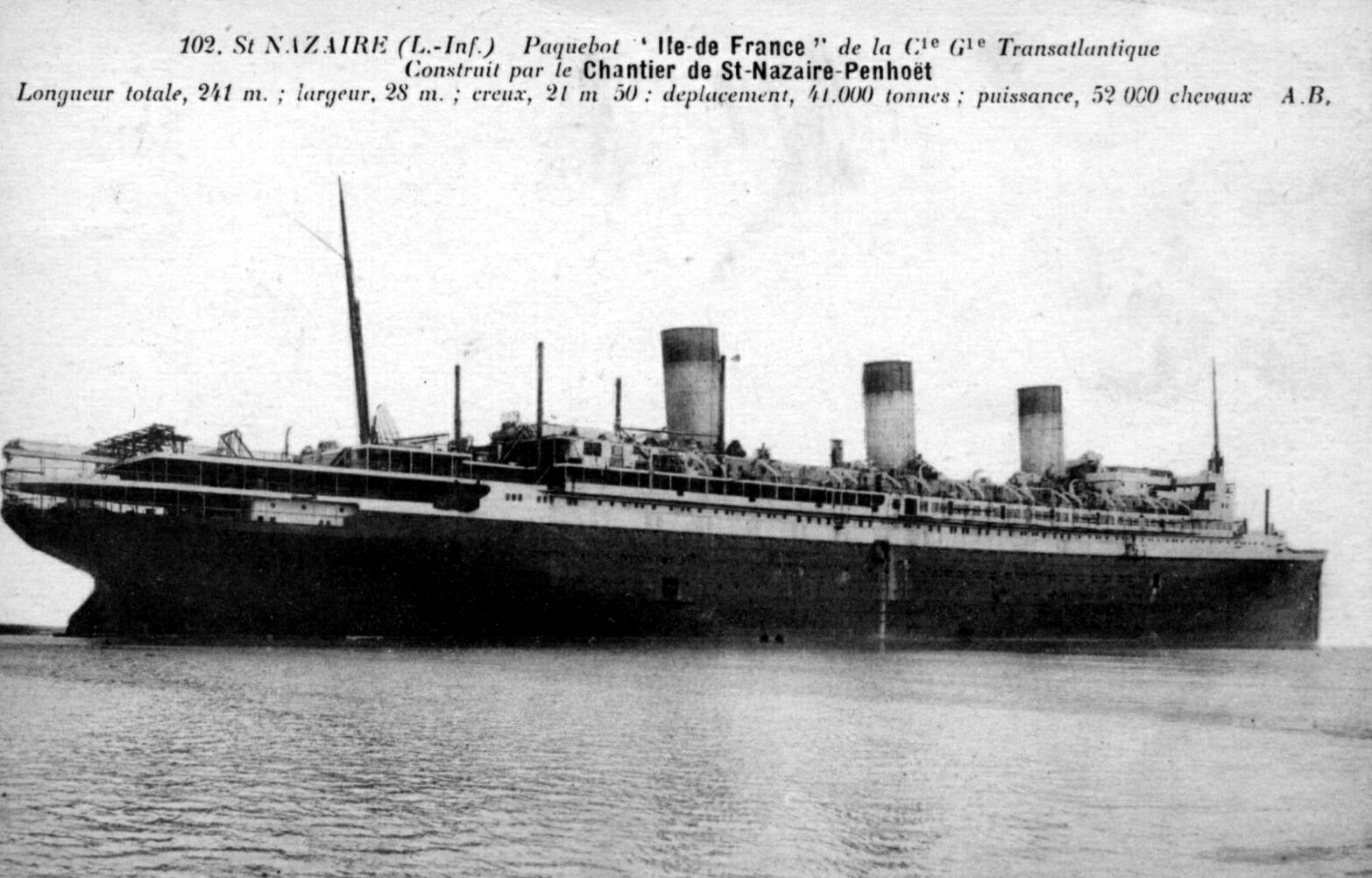
Île de France's stern view in Le Havre, 1929

After her sea trials, Île de France traveled to her home port of Le Havre on June 5, 1927. The novelty of Art Deco aboard a ship was an immediate sensation and the reaction of the visiting press would be evident by favorable reviews the next week.

On June 22, 1927 Île de France traveled from Le Havre for its maiden voyage to New York. Upon its arrival in New York it received great attention from the American media and thousands of people crowded the docks just to see the new ship.

Her official accommodation was for 1,786 passengers, but her normal capacity was closer to 1400. With a listed capacity of 537 in first-class, Île de France, like France and Paris, became fashionable. Captain Joseph Blancart and his chief purser, Henri Villar, became celebrities.

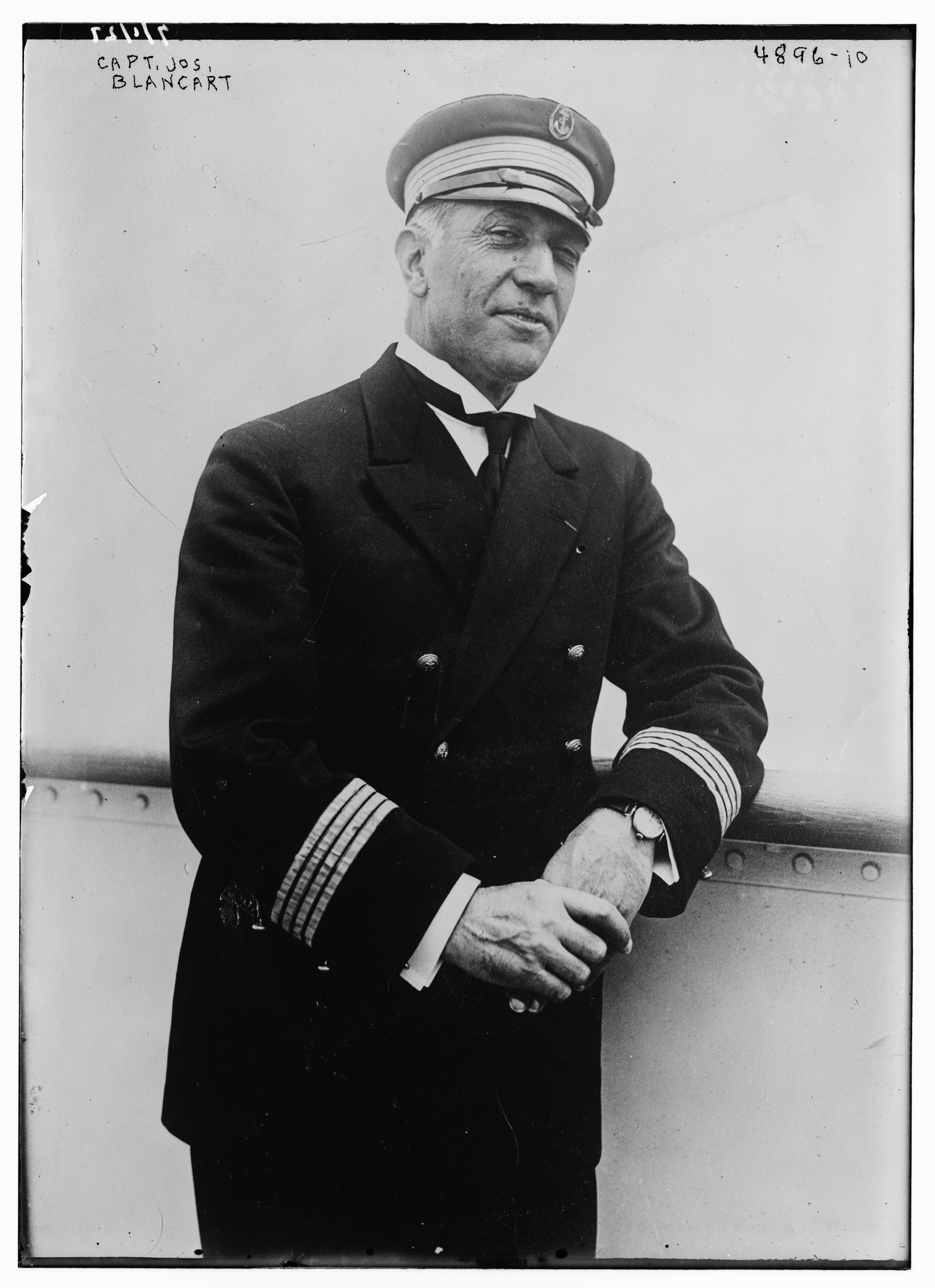
Captain Joseph Blancart

With the contribution made by this vessel, the CGT ended the year 1928 with record earnings. For the first time the company's receipts exceeded a billion francs, and half of this derived from the New York service, which had transported more than 90,000 passengers. By 1935, the ship had carried more first-class passengers than any other transatlantic liner.

The ship was popular especially among wealthy Americans. It quickly became the chosen ship of the youthful, the stylish, and the famous. But they did not choose it for its speed – it was about as fast as the Aquitania of 1914, and no larger. In 1936 it was immortalised in the song "A Fine Romance" performed by Fred Astaire and Ginger Rogers in the film Swing Time with the lyric "You're just as hard to land as the Île de France".

Even though Île de France was not the fastest vessel in the world, it briefly pioneered the quickest mail system between Europe and the United States. In July 1928, a seaplane catapult was installed at the ship's stern for trials with two CAMS 37 flying boats that launched when the ship was within 200 miles, which decreased the mail delivery time by one day. This practice proved too costly, however, and in October 1930 the catapult was removed and the service discontinued.

In 1935 Île de France and Paris were joined by a new mate, the new superliner Normandie. With these three ships the CGT could boast of having the largest, fastest, and most luxurious ships traveling the north Atlantic.

But this was not to endure, and two events ended the CGT's new prosperity. The first occurred on April 18, 1939, when Paris was destroyed by fire while docked in Le Havre. The second was on September 1, 1939, when Nazi Germany invaded Poland which began World War II and ended civilian (as opposed to military) transatlantic traffic.

== World War II ==
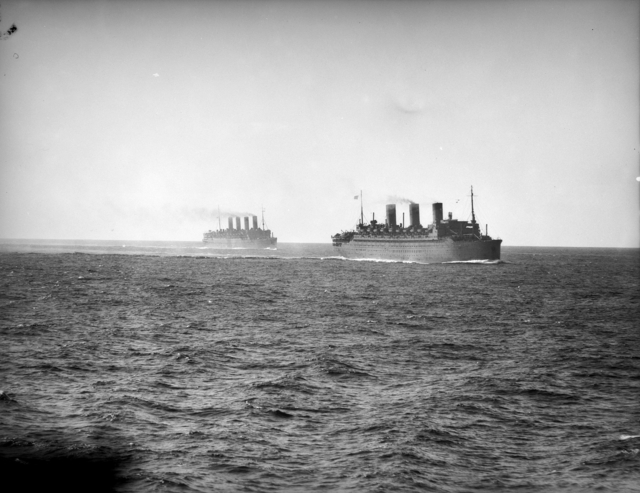
Île de France and Aquitania underway as troopships (taken during Operation Pamphlet in 1943)

Île de France was the last civilian ship to leave France before the outbreak of war. She departed from Le Havre on the morning of September 3, 1939, just hours before France and the United Kingdom declared war on Germany. (The last ship to leave Europe during the war would be the paquebot Jamaique that left in May 1940 from Bordeaux to South America). Île de France carried 1,777 passengers, 400 more than her usual number. Most of the passengers were Americans, many of whom were tourists clamouring to leave France before the war broke out. During the voyage, the passengers were not only inconvenienced by the overcrowded conditions, but their activities were limited because the ship sailed with her lights extinguished. Other ships were not so lucky. Île de France arrived in New York harbor on September 9 and, while she was crossing the Atlantic Ocean, 16 vessels were sunk by torpedoes, mines, or gunfire.

Once the ship was berthed at its New York pier, her career as a passenger ship was temporarily ended. Since the French were not anxious to return the ship to its homeland, she was towed to Staten Island by ten tugs and was laid up after special dredging that cost $30,000. Her crew of 800 persons was reduced to a security staff of 100 while she was inoperative for the next five months. Then during March 1940, commanded by the British Admiralty, to which it had been lent, the ship was loaded with 12,000 tons of war materials, submarine oil, tanks, shells, and several uncrated bombers that were stowed on the aft open decks. On 1 May 1940, she departed for Europe, veiled in gray and black. From there, she traveled to Singapore where, after the Fall of France, she was officially seized by the British. In 1941 she returned to New York and made several crossings from the northeast as a troop ship such as the one on February 14, 1944, sailing from Halifax, Nova Scotia, to Greenock, Scotland, carrying among others the 814th Tank Destroyer Battalion.

In October, 1942, Île de France tied up alongside the Charl Malan Quay in Port Elizabeth, South Africa. Furniture, chandeliers, carpets, fittings, and hundreds of square feet of rare and beautiful panelling were torn out as "she was gutted as thoroughly as a herring". A small party of workmen then fitted the liner out as a floating prisoner of war camp, "with festoons of barbed wire sprouting from her decks and disfiguring her graceful lines" as the ship was prepared for the task of bringing POWs back from north Africa.

The extensive alterations were the largest ever undertaken in the harbour, and were completed in 1943.

== Post-war career ==
In autumn 1945, Île de France was returned to the CGT after five years of military service with the British Admiralty. In honour of its wartime performance, the Southern Railway company named one of its locomotives French Line CGT.

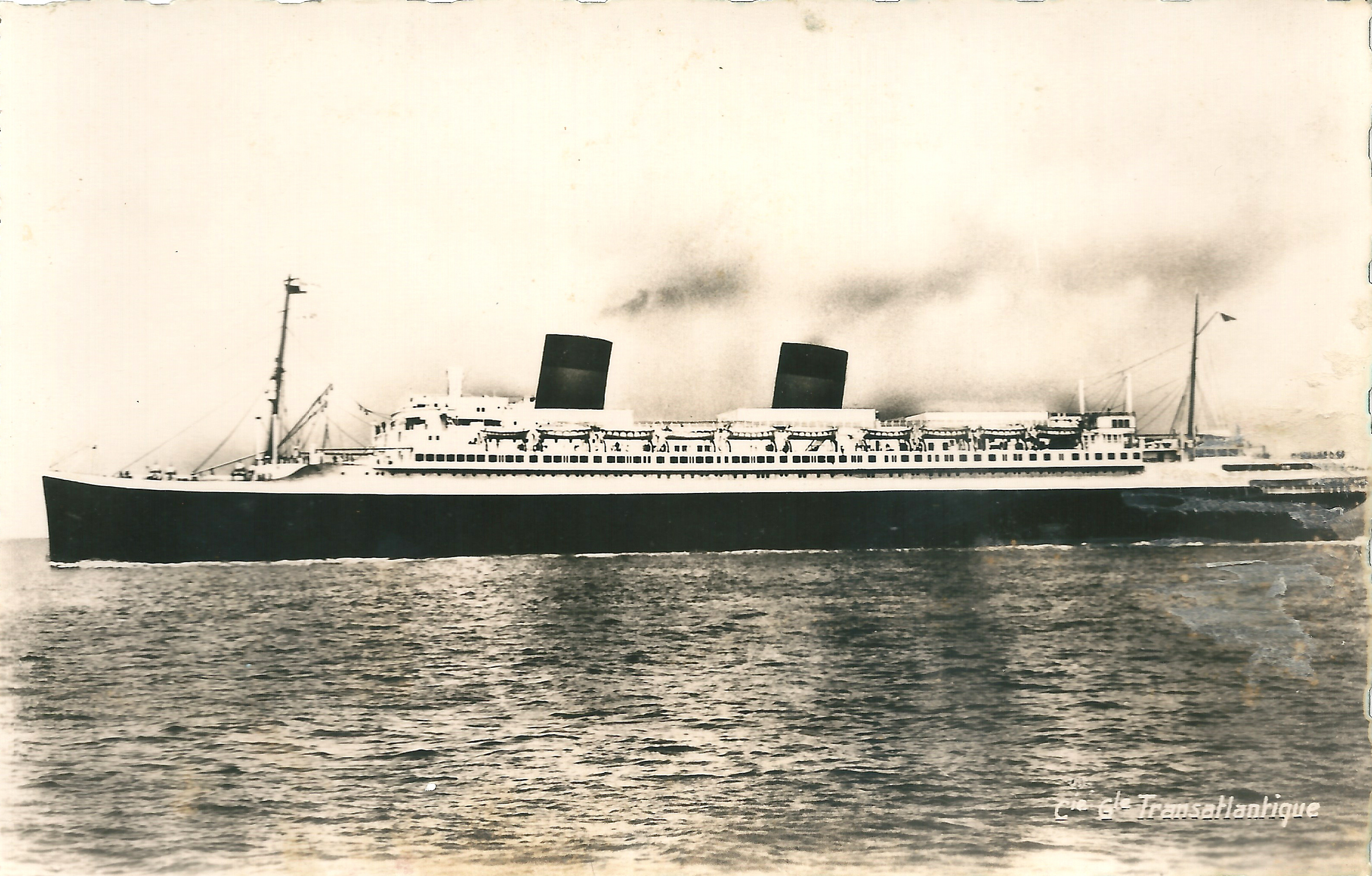
Île de France after her post-war reconstruction, c. 1948

At first Île de France was used to ferry American and Canadian troops home. Then in April 1947, the ship returned to its builder's yard at Saint Nazaire for a two-year restoration. The outcome included the removal of its third "dummy" funnel and an upturn of the straight black hull to meet its upper forepeak, in keeping with the new style of the CGT's ships beginning with Normandie in 1935. These changes increased Île-de-France's gross tonnage to 44,356.

She travelled to New York on her first postwar luxury crossing in July 1949. Île de France proved to be just as popular as before the war. In 1950 the ship received a new running mate, Liberté, the former German Blue Riband-holder SS Europa.

In 1949 Île de France was the setting for part of the first act of the Jules Styne Broadway musical Gentlemen Prefer Blondes starring Carol Channing.

On September 21, 1953, the ship rescued 25 of the 26 man crew off the Liberian freighter Greenville which was damaged and later sank in an Atlantic tropical storm.

On July 26, 1956, Île de France had a major role in the rescue operation after the collision of the passenger liners Andrea Doria and Stockholm off Nantucket. Of 1,706 passengers and crew of the Andrea Doria, about 753 were transferred to the Île de France during the approximately 6-hour rescue operation. For this Île de France received Merchant Marine Gallant Ship Citation.

== Scrapping ==
With the development of jet transport, and the decline of ocean travel, the CGT wished to dispose of the ship quietly. In November 1958 she departed New York for the last time and, in 1959 was sold to a Japanese breaker and departed Le Havre on February 26. She was renamed Furansu Maru and the French flag was replaced with the Japanese flag

Just before being scrapped, the ship was used as a floating prop for the 1960 Metro-Goldwyn-Mayer disaster film The Last Voyage with the fictional name SS Claridon. The CGT sued MGM to have the ship's funnels repainted and prohibit the name Île de France from appearing on the ship in the movie.

The movie was filmed almost entirely in the Inland Sea off the coast of Osaka. During filming, the ship was partially sunk, explosive devices were detonated in the interior, and the forward funnel was sent crashing into the deck-house. After the film was finished, the Japanese scrappers refloated the vessel and towed her to the scrap yard. She was fully scrapped by 1961.

== Legacy ==
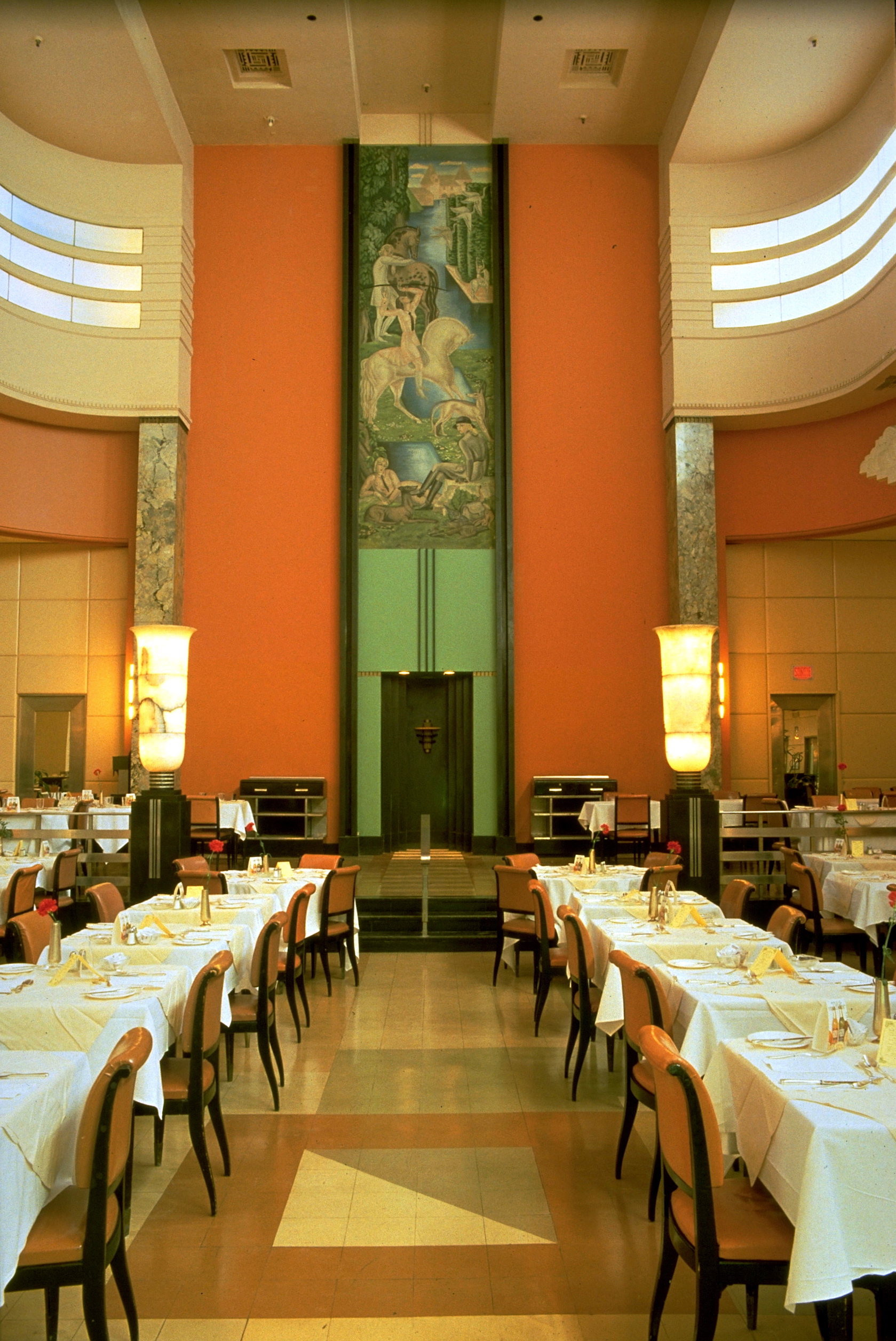
Eaton's Ninth Floor restaurant in 1987

In 1931 the ninth floor restaurant in Eaton's Department Store, Montreal, Québec, Canada, was styled after the first class restaurant aboard the ship. Lady Eaton, the store owner's wife, had just travelled on the liner and requested the style of the Île de France.

Île de France is also the logo and namesake of French-Imported premium cheese brand, Île-de-France.

== In popular culture ==
In the Fred Astaire/Ginger Rogers movie Swing Time, Dorothy Fields's lyrics to "A Fine Romance", sung by a frustrated Rogers to a disinterested Astaire, include the line, "You're just as hard to land as the Île de France."

Île de France is referenced on the sitcom I Love Lucy, Season 1, Episode 32, “Lucy gets Ricky on the radio”.

== See also ==
- SS France (1910)
- SS Normandie
- SS Liberté
- Pierre-Marie Poisson
