= Alfred-Alphonse Bottiau =

French sculptor

Alfred-Alphonse Bottiau (6 February 1889 – 25 February 1951) was a French sculptor. He was born in Valenciennes and after early studies in his home town he studied in Paris under Jean Antoine Injalbert and was runner-up for the Prix de Rome for sculpture in 1919. Bottiau had joined the army in 1910 and served until 1919. He was director of the Écoles Académiques de Valenciennes from 1946 to 1951.

== Commissioned works ==
=== Chateau-Thierry American Monument ===
Bottiau often worked with the architect Paul Philippe Cret and together they carried out several commissions for the American Battle Monuments Commission. One such commission was the Chateau-Thierry American Monument which lies southeast of the Aisne-Marne American Cemetery. Bottiau was the sculptor of the two enormous figures representing France and the United States, which adorn the west face of this monument. This monument is known as the "Monument de la Côté 204" and it was erected to celebrate the role played by U.S soldiers in this sector in July 1918 during the Second Battle of the Marne. It was inaugurated in 1930. An enormous eagle and shield stand in front of the east face of the monument and although this has not been established to be the case, this could also be the work of Bottiau, as he worked with Cret in Philadelphia and was the sculptor of the eagle and allegorical reliefs on the Federal Reserve Bank of Philadelphia building there. Bottiau had travelled to the United States in 1932 and worked on several commissions in that country.

=== Memorial Chapel in Belleau ===
Bottiaux also worked on the Memorial Chapel in the Aisne-Marne American Cemetery. This cemetery covers those deaths incurred in the Aisne-Marne offensive which took place from May to October 1918. The cemetery holds 2,289 graves, among which are 250 soldiers whose remains could not be identified. Most of the deaths occurred during the Second Battle of the Marne. Another 1,060 men died but their remains were never found and their names are recorded on the walls of the Memorial Chapel. This Memorial Chapel was erected over front line trenches dug by the American Army's 2nd Division as part of the defence of Belleau Wood. Bottiau carried out the chapel's decorative embellishments to the design of William F.Ross and Company of East Cambridge in Massachusetts.

Bottiau's work on the Memorial Chapel includes the relief in the tympanum above the chapel entrance. In the centre of Bottiau's composition is a crusader in armour, the defender of "Right", and on either side of this crusader are the shields of the United States and France, these being intertwined with branches of oak, a symbol of the traditional unity of the two countries.

On the capitals of the three columns on either side of the entrance to this Memorial Chapel are carvings by Bottiau which depict scenes from the trenches. On the right hand side are a group of soldiers preparing for a bayonet charge, some riflemen with automatic rifles and a further group of riflemen with non-automatic weapons. On the left hand side we have some artillery observers, a machine gun crew and soldiers launching grenades.

Bottiau also carried out eleven carvings on the capitals of the belfry columns, these representing the various units involved in the war. Bayonets represent the Infantry, Cannon the Artillery, Tanks represent the Tank Corps, Crossed Heavy Machine Guns the Machine Gun Units. We then have propellers representing Aviation units and artillery rounds for both the Artillery and Ordnance. The Engineers are represented by a plane-table, the Medics by a Greek Cross and Caduceus. Airplane engines represent Aviation repair units and a mule's head over which is engraved "8 Chev" the Transport units, the "Chev 8" being the French railway boxcar used to transport 40 men or 8 horses. Finally oak leaves represent the Judge Advocate General Corps. These carvings appear again in groups of seven on each side of the chapel. On the north face is a mule's head, bayonets, a plane-table, crossed machine guns, Greek cross and caduceus, airplane engines and cannon, on the south face the grouping is a plane table, crossed machine guns, oak leaves, Greek cross and caduceus, cannon, propellers and tanks. On the west face the grouping is artillery rounds, bayonets, plane-table, airplane engines, cannon, propellers and tanks and on the east face the grouping covers artillery rounds, mule's head, bayonets, oak leaves, Greek cross and caduceus, cannon, propellers and tanks.

The arches of the belfry openings carry carvings of small arms ammunition, the front view of a machine gun and projectile, field packs with entrenching tools attached and selected officer and enlisted insignia. Engraved on the sills are orientation arrows with distances to points of historic interest.

Finally below the belfry openings are sculptured heads representing some of the men and women who served in the Allied armed forces. We have a French soldier, a French nurse, an American aviator, a Scottish soldier, a Russian soldier, a Portuguese soldier, a Canadian aviator, and a British Women's Army Corps driver. The same heads appear on each side of the chapel but in a different order.

=== Meuse-Argonne Memorial ===
Bottiau also carried out work in the Meuse-Argonne American Cemetery and Memorial. The cemetery stands on ground taken from the Germans in 1918 by the 32nd Infantry Division. There is a chapel in the cemetery and Bottiau carved the bas-relief in the tympanum above the chapel's entrance. The composition shows two kneeling figures representing "Grief" and "Remembrance" and on the lintel underneath are the words "IN SACRED SLEEP THEY REST". Alongside the entrance door carved heads of American soldiers appear on the column capitals.

We can see another example of Bottiau and Cret's cooperation in the Flanders Field American Cemetery and Memorial. Cret was the architect of the cemetery and memorial and Bottiau's work can be seen particularly on the Memorial Chapel's walls. This cemetery is situated where the U.S.91st Division suffered many casualties in October/November 1918.

There is also incidentally a memorial in Belleau Wood itself to the 4th Marine Brigade of the 2nd Division which was primarily responsible for the capture of the wood. The memorial features a life-size bronze bas-relief by Felix de Weldon. It was de Weldon who was the sculptor of the iconic memorial at Iwo-Jima.

=== Bellicourt Monument ===
Another Cret/Bottiaux co-operation with the American Battle Memorial Commission involves the Bellicourt American Monument which stands near to the Somme American Cemetery. The memorial commemorates the troops of the United States who fought in France during 1917 and 1918. The monument was erected above a canal tunnel which was one of the main defence features of the German Army's "Hindenburg Line" a line broken by American troops in their September 1918 offensive. The monument comprises a large rectangular stone block standing on a two-stepped terrace. On the eastern face are two bas-relief figures carved by Bottiau. One represents "Valour" and the other "Remembrance". An American flag is in the centre of the composition topped by an eagle. The monument was dedicated on 9 August 1937.

Bottiau also worked on the Mondemont monument celebrating the First Battle of the Marne. Henri Bouchard was the sculptor chosen for the figure of "Victory", the main feature of this remarkable monument but the bas reliefs at the base of the monument were a work of cooperation between Alfred Bottiau and two other sculptors Albert Patrisse and René André Duparc.

== Other works ==
Work	Image	Location	Date(s)	Subject, notes and references
Le Monument aux Morts (War Memorial).		Solesmes, Nord, France		Bottiau was the sculptor of the soldier on this memorial's pedestal. The soldier, cast by Bottiau in bronze, is caught in a moment of action; his left hand is clenched and he holds a grenade in his right hand. The memorial was inaugurated on 8 June 1924.
Church of Saint-Pierre and Saint-Paul, Guise. (fr:Église Saint-Pierre-et-Saint-Paul de Guise).		Guise, Aisne, Picardy	1932-1933	Bottiau carved two statues for this church. One was entitled "Christ du Sacré-Coeur" and the other "Immaculée Conception". Bottiau depicts in the former a figure of Christ and the latter the Virgin Mary, both sculpted in the "Art Déco" style. For the same church Bottiau carved in wood two winged Angels holding a crown but these have been damaged by insects so are not in the best of condition.
The Monument to Armand Larmuzeaux.		Origny-en-Thiérache, Aisne, Picardy		Bottiau was the sculptor of this monument.
Statue in the "Jardin aux Fleurs"		Cambrai, Nord-Pas-de-Calais	1946	Bottiau's statue of Baptiste de Cambray was his last work before his death.
Relief on front of the building then occupied by the newspaper "L’Echo du Nord"		Lille, Nord-Pas-de-Calais		Bottiau worked on this relief with a fellow sculptor Raymond-Emile Couvegnes
"Froissart remettant ses chroniques à Philippa de Hainaut".		Valenciennes		This work is in the Square Saint Géry at the foot of the church of the same name. Froissart had been the first person to write a history of France.
L'Inspiration		Valenciennes	1937	Relief sculpture on a building in the rue de Hesques. This is a copy of a relief sculpted by Bottiau for the Palais du Trocadéro in Paris. Bottiau sculpted Pegasus, the mythical winged divine horse, as an allegory for inspiration.
"La Légende de l'Atre de Gertrude"		Dodenne Tower in Valenciennes.	1937	This small bas-relief is fixed to a wall of the Tour de la Dodenne and is intended as a tribute by Valenciennes to Bottiau. In October 1979 a committee was established to see how Valenciennes could honour one of her famous sons. 10,000 francs was raised and this bronze relief, made by Bottiau in 1937 was purchased. The work depicts the story of the Atre of Gertrude. The inauguration of this work took place on 23 May 1981.
"Mademoiselle"		Valenciennes		This bust is in the Musée des Beaux-Arts in Valenciennes.
Monument Nungesser		Valenciennes	1929	Charles Nungesser (1892-1927) was a French aviator during the First World War and was known as the "le fou volant". On 8 May 1927, with his navigator François Coli, he attempted the first flight across the North Atlantic but ditched in the sea and perished. The statue was inaugurated on 1 September 1929.
"Nausicaa"		Montpellier, Languedoc-Roussillon, Hérault		This Bottiau work stands in the grounds of the Collège Clémence Royer in the Boulevard Pasteur in Montpellier. Because of the difficulty of moving such items during the Second World War there were no means of transporting the statue to Valenciennes as originally intended and it remained in Montpellier and in the grounds of the Royer college. After the war the college principal, Jean Vassal, decided to put the work on a pedestal and keep it permantently in the college.
Galerie Vincent Lécuyer		Paris	1913	In this gallery at 34 rue de Lille there is a relief in bronze by Bottiaus entitled "Le Soir".
The Palace Cinema		Valenciennes		Bottiau sculpted a bas-relief for this cinema at 131 rue du Quesnoy which is sadly no longer used and in a bad state of repair.
Eaton's Ninth Floor Restaurant		Montreal, Quebec, Canada		Another of Bottiau's works, this done in collaboration with D. Gelin, can be seen outside the restaurant on Eaton's Ninth Floor in Montreal, Canada. It is a bas-relief.

== See also ==
- American Battle Monuments Commission
- Paul Philippe Cret
- Felix de Weldon
