= Eaton Operatic Society =

Canadian musical organization

Eaton Operatic Society was a Canadian musical organization located in Toronto, Ontario, that operated from 1919 to 1965. Originally a choir known as the Eaton Choral Society, the group morphed into a light opera company in 1932 and, in 1954, began to focus on musicals.

== History ==
=== Eaton Choral Society (1919–1931) ===
The organization began as a choir, the Eaton Choral Society (ECS), when it was formed by employees of the T. Eaton Co department store in 1919 with Herbert M. Fletcher as its founding conductor. The choir's first performance was given inside the store to honor the one year anniversary of the Armistice of 11 November 1918. The choir's first official concert was given on February 4, 1920, at Toronto's Massey Hall in a varied program extending from opera excerpts to choral arrangements of spirituals and folk songs, among other repertoire. The guest soloist for this concert was Metropolitan Opera soprano Marie Rappold.

The group returned to Massey Hall for annual concerts in Toronto, assembling an orchestra mainly of players from the Toronto Symphony Orchestra. In 1921 the chorus had 120 voices, and the choir grew to 250 voices for its 1922 performance. The death of John Craig Eaton led the choir to cancel the 1922 concert at Massey Hall, but it ultimately sang the planned program at Christie Street Veterans' Hospital in May 1922. Notable performers who appeared with the choir included sopranos Lucy Gates (1921, 1923, & 1925), Jeanne Dusseau (1922), Florence Macbeth (1924), and Mary Lewis (1928); tenor Umberto Sacchetti (1925), harpist Carlos Salzedo (1923), and bass-baritone Frank Phillips (1928),

Reginald Stewart was appointed as ECS's conductor in June 1924. The 1925 concert under his leadership included the large-scale dramatic choral and orchestral work The Revenge: A Ballad of the Fleet, Op. 24, by Charles Villiers Stanford, as well as excerpts from operas. In 1926, T. J. Crawford replaced Stewart as conductor. Some larger choral works were performed by the choir under Crawford, including Samuel Coleridge-Taylor's Hiawatha's Wedding Feast (1926), Colerdige-Taylor's A Tale of Old Japan (1927), and Gustav Holst's The Mystic Trumpeter (1928).

In 1929 the ECS's 10th anniversary concert featured the entire first act of Richard Wagner's Lohengrin with Paul Althouse singing the title role, Marie Sundelius as Elsa, Dorothy Allan Park as Ortrud, Poul Bai as Friedrich of Telramund, and Sigurd Nilssen as Heinrich der Vogler. In 1930 the choir performed George Frideric Handel's oratorio Judas Maccabaeus with guest soloists including soprano Emma Otero, tenor Richard Crooks, and baritone Frank Oldfield. In 1931 the ECS inaugurated the newly built Eaton Auditorium with a performance of Arthur Sullivan's cantata The Golden Legend, featuring Grace Moore as a guest soloist.

=== Eaton Operatic Society (1932–1965) ===
In February 1932, ECS announced that it would abandon choral work in favor of staging Gilbert and Sullivan's comic opera Iolanthe with a formal change in policy instituted to transform the group into a light opera organization. The organization was renamed Eaton Operatic Society (EOS), and its first presentation under the EOS name was on March 2, 1932. Crawford continued as conductor of EOS until 1947.

The group continued to mount light opera at the Eaton Auditorium every spring through 1965. It also toured its productions frequently to other cities in southern Ontario, and it performed at Canadian army bases during World War II. In its early years, the Savoy operas of Gilbert and Sullivan were its chief repertoire, including Iolanthe (1932, 1938, 1950), The Gondoliers (1933, 1939, 1948, 1954), The Mikado (1934, 1940, 1949), The Yeoman of the Guard (1935, 1941, 1952), and The Pirates of Penzance (1936, 1942, 1953). Beginning in 1954, the society's repertory consisted exclusively of musicals and such operettas as The Vagabond King (1957, 1965) and Rose-Marie (1959).

In 1947 Harry Norris succeeded Crawford as the EOS's music director. He left after only one season when Godfrey Ridout became director. Ridout remained for nine years and was succeeded by Lloyd Bradshaw (1959–1961) and Horace Lapp (1962–1965). Lois Marshall performed with EOS.
