= List of schools in Greece =

This is an incomplete list of schools in Greece, sorted by region. While there is no hierarchy of prestige in Greek secondary education, the public and the private (with tuition) schools listed below are well-known and have a satisfactory record as preparatory schools.

== Attica ==
- American Community School of Athens, Chalandri
- Anavryta Experimental Lyceum, Marousi
- Athens College, Psychiko
- Costeas-Geitonas School, Pallini
- German School of Athens, Marousi
- International School of Athens, Kifissia
- Ionideios Model High School of Piraeus, Piraeus
- Lycée Franco-Hellénique Eugène Delacroix, Agia Paraskevi
- Moraitis School, Psychiko
- Philippine School in Greece, Vyronas
- Rizarios Ecclesiastical School of Athens, Chalandri
- Varvakeion High School, Psychiko

=== Athens ===
- Arsakeia Schools
- Byron College
- Campion School
- Doukas School
- Geitonas School
- Grava School Complex
- Hill Memorial School
- Kessaris School
- Lycee Franco-Hellenique
- Lycée Léonin
- Pierce College - American College of Greece
- Scuola Italiana Statale di Atene
- Sivitanideios School of Arts and Crafts
- St. Catherine's British Embassy School, Lykovrysi
- St. Lawrence College
- 1st High School of Ymittos (Greek public school)
- 3rd High School of Kifissia (Greek public school)
- 3rd High School of Paleo Faliro (Greek public school)
- 5th Junior High School of Nea Smyrni (Greek public school)

== Central Macedonia ==
- Anatolia College, Pylaia
- Pinewood - The American International School, Thermi

=== Thessaloniki ===
- American Farm School
- Anaximander (31st) High School of Thessaloniki
- Aristotelio Kollegio
- Arsakeio Highschool and Lyceum of Thessaloniki
- De La Salle, Greek-French College
- Experimental School of Thessaloniki (Greek public school)
- French School of Thessaloniki
- German School of Thessaloniki
- Hellenic College Thessaloniki
- Kalamari Greek-french School
- Korais Thessaloniki School, Peraia, Thessaloniki
- Mandoulides Schools
- Peiramatiko Lyceum (Greek public school)
- Vassiliadis School of Thessaloniki
- 1st EPAL Chalastras (Greek public school)
- 1st General Lyceum Chalastras (Greek public school)

== Eastern Macedonia and Thrace ==
- Hayriyye Madrasa, Komotini

== Epirus ==
- Zosimaia School, Ioannina

== Ionian Islands ==
- High School of Kassiopi, Kassiopi (Greek public school)
- School of Othonoi, Othonoi

== North Aegean ==
- Model Vocational Lyceum (PEPAL) of TEENS, a non-tuition, free of charge, Private Model Vocational Nautical High School, Chios

== Peloponnese ==
=== Patras ===
- 1st High School of Patras, there are also other 12 Public High Schools (Greek public school).
- 13th High School of Patras (Greek public school)
- Arsakeio High School Of Patras
- Patras Experimental Lyceum (Greek public school)
- 7th EPAL Patras (Greek public school)
- Music High School Of Patras (Greek public school)

== Thessaly ==
- The International Community School of Larissa, Larissa

== Mount Athos ==
- Athonite Academy, Karyes

== See also ==
- List of universities in Greece
- List of Foreign Archaeological Institutes in Greece
