= Gardiki =

Gardiki (Greek: Γαρδίκι), older form Gardikion, is a Greek toponym derived from proto-Slavic Gordьkь, "town, fortified settlement" (cf. Grad (toponymy)), and may refer to the following villages in Greece and Albania:

- Greek for Kardhiq, a village in southern Albania
- Gardiki Omilaion, a village in Phthiotis, part of Spercheiada
- Gardiki, Thesprotia, a village in Thesprotia, part of Souli
- Gardiki, Filiates, a village in Thesprotia, part of Filiates
- Gardiki, Phthiotis, a village in Phthiotis regional unit, now named Pelasgia
- Gardiki, Trikala, a village in the Trikala regional unit
- Megalo Gardiki, a village in the Ioannina regional unit, part of Pasaronas
- Gardiki Castle, Corfu, castle on Corfu island built in the 13th century AD
- Gardiki Castle, Arcadia, castle near Chirades, municipality of Megalopoli
- An older name for the village of Anavryto, Arcadia
- Gardikaki ("Little Gardiki"), an older name for the village of Oiti in Phthiotis
- Palaiogardiki ("Old Gardiki"), site of the ancient city of Pelinna, in Thessaly
