= Kassiopi Castle =

Castle on the northeastern coast of Corfu, Greece

- Κάστρο Κασσιώπης
- Part of Byzantine Defences of Corfu
- Corfu, Ionian Islands, Greece
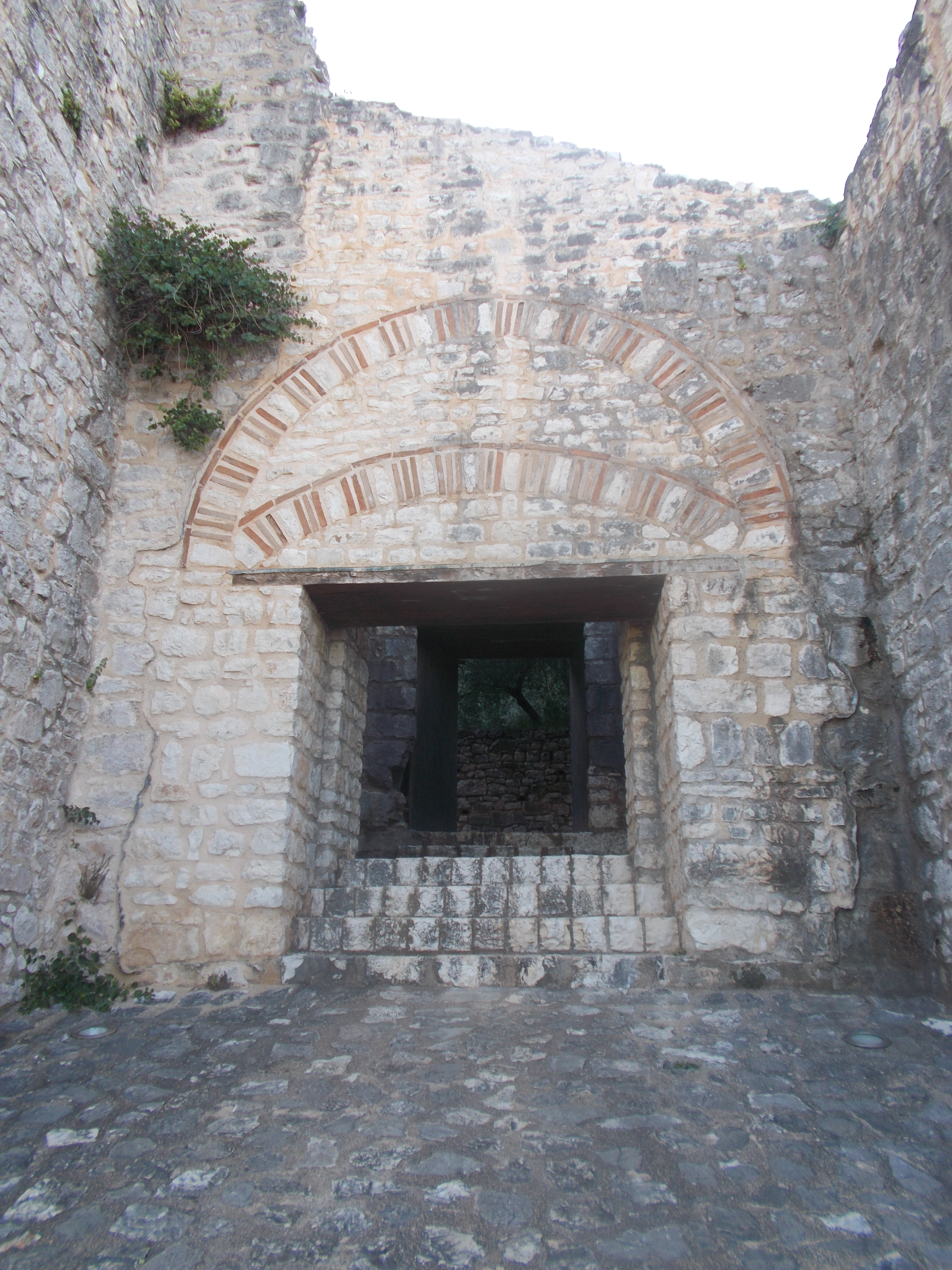
- Main gate of the castle

Site information
- Type: citadel
- Owner: Greece Greek Ministry of Culture
- Controlled by: Byzantine Empire 6th century–1081; Bohemund of Taranto 1081–1085; Byzantine Empire 1085-1267; Anjou 1267-1386; Republic of Venice 1386–1797; Corcyre 1797–1800; Septinsular Republic 1800–1807; First French Empire 1807–14; United States of the Ionian Islands 1815–64; Greece c. 1864
- Open to the public: Yes
- Condition: Ruin

Location
- Location within Greece
- Coordinates: 39.791095°N 19.921139°E

Site history
- Built: 6th-10th Century?
- Built by: Unknown
- Materials: hewn stone (ashlar)
- Demolished: 20th century
- Events: Siege of Corfu (1716)

Kassiopi Castle (Greek: Κάστρο Κασσιώπης) is a castle on the northeastern coast of Corfu overseeing the fishing village of Kassiopi. It was one of three Byzantine-period castles that defended the island before the Venetian era (1386–1797). The castles formed a defensive triangle, with Gardiki guarding the island's south, Kassiopi the northeast and Angelokastro the northwest.

Its position at the northeastern coast of Corfu overseeing the Corfu Channel that separates the island from the mainland gave the castle an important vantage point and an elevated strategic significance.

Kassiopi Castle is considered one of the most imposing architectural remains in the Ionian Islands, along with Angelokastro, Gardiki Castle and the two Venetian Fortresses of Corfu City, the Citadel and the New Fort.

== Origins ==
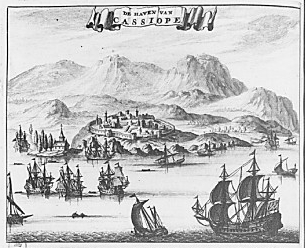
View of the castle in 1688

The exact origins of the castle are not clear, with various theories being advanced, but they appear to be Byzantine. During excavations in the two towers adjacent to the main gate as well as in a third tower to the north side of the main gate, bronze coins from the reigns of Byzantine emperors Maurice (582–602 AD) and Basil II (976–1025) were discovered.

In addition ceramic ostraca dating from the early Byzantine period, the 4th–7th centuries AD, were also unearthed. This leads to the conclusion that a Byzantine castle may have been built in the area by the 6th century AD, a date which is several centuries earlier than the currently estimated date of the present castle's construction.

== History ==
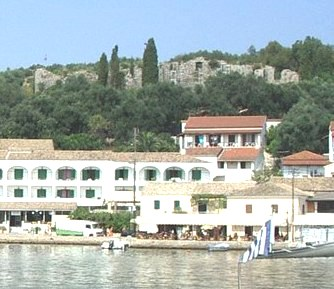
Kassiopi Castle as viewed from the port of Kassiopi

In 1081 Count Bohemund of Taranto conquered the castle at the start of the first Norman invasion of Greece.

In 1084 the fortress fell into the hands of Alexios I Komnenos after he defeated the Norman fleet following three naval battles in the Corfu Channel. In 1267 the Angevins took over the castle and in 1386 the castle fell to the Venetians after some initial resistance.

=== Destruction and neglect by the Venetians ===
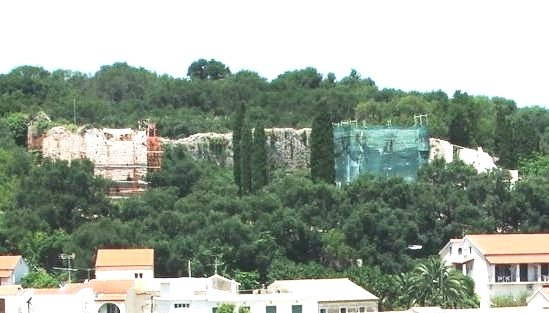
Kassiopi Castle renovations during modern times

The Venetians ordered the destruction of the castle because its defenders resisted their takeover of Corfu in 1386 and did not willingly surrender. The Venetians subsequently dismantled it, fearing it could be captured by their enemies, or by the locals, and used against them. Even in later times they did not repair or maintain it, in contrast to their efforts at strengthening Angelokastro and the Old Fortress of Corfu. The consequence of the Venetian action was that during the Turkish sieges of Corfu in 1537 and 1716 the local people who could not escape were slaughtered or enslaved.

There is also evidence provided by famous Venetian architects Michele Sanmicheli and his son Giangerolamo Sanmicheli that, while under contract to the Venetians to reinforce the Old Fortress of Corfu during the Ottoman inter-siege period of 1537–1558, they carried materials from Kassiopi Castle to the citadel for their repairs.

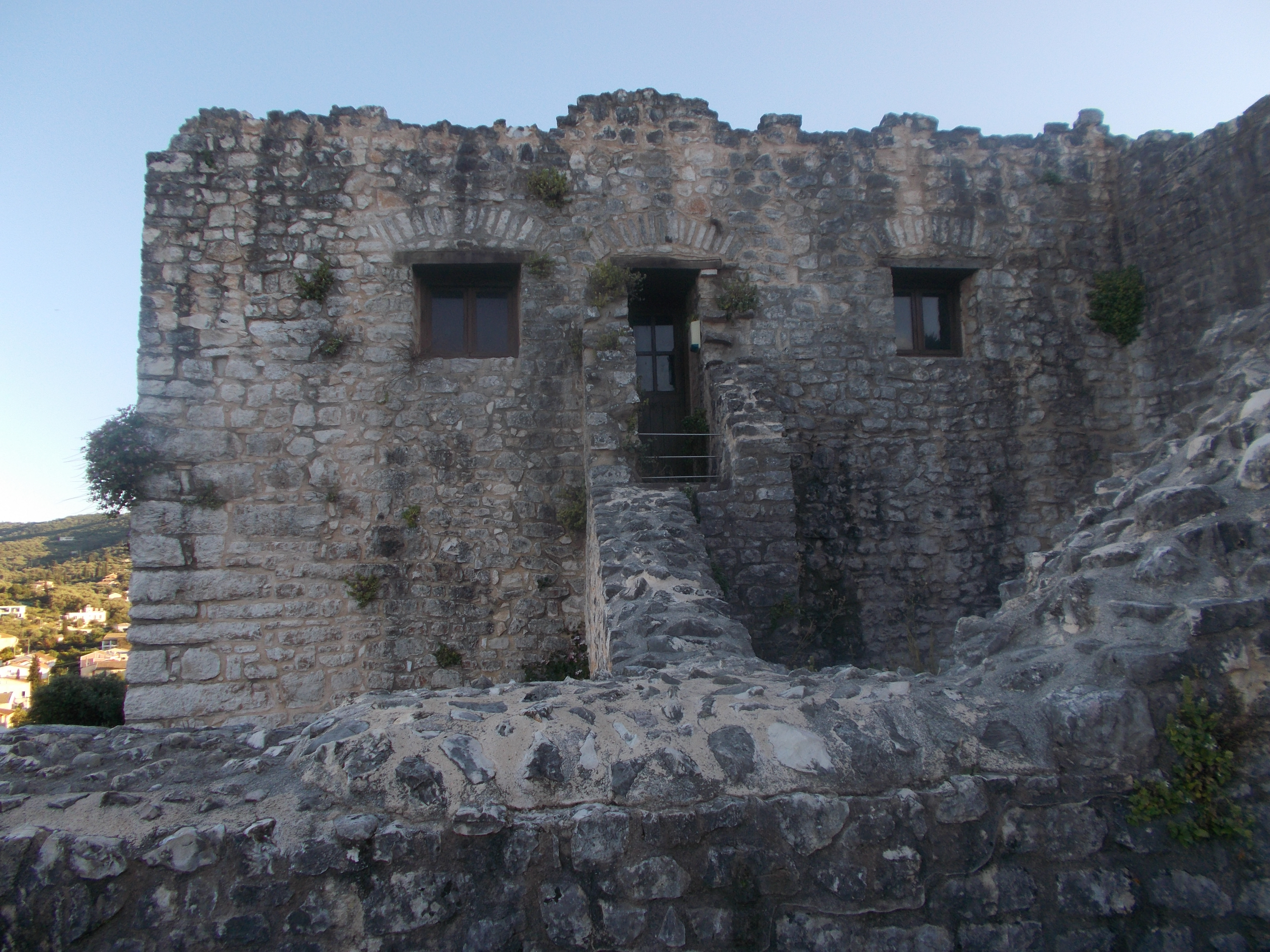
Detail of the south wing of the entrance at Kassiopi Castle

After the 1669 Venetian surrender of Candia in Crete to the Ottomans, Corfu became the last Venetian possession and bastion in the Levante. Consequently, the Venetians redoubled their efforts at strengthening the defences of the island. In 1671 a Venetian official by the name of Dona was sent to evaluate the defences of Corfu and submit a plan to the Venetian Senate.

Dona went in situ to Kassiopi to evaluate the castle and its prospects of defending Corfu from the Ottomans who were planning an invasion of the island from Epirus. Dona went along with Venetian special commander of the Adriatic, and future Doge of Venice, Mocenigo. Based on further advice by general St. Andrea and military engineer Verneda, Dona's report to the Venetian Senate supported the strengthening of the Kassiopi Fortress. Despite Dona's advice the Venetians abandoned all plans of defending Kassiopi.

A century after the castle's destruction, folk tales developed of fire-breathing dragons who had destroyed the castle and poisoned the people of the village. The genesis of these myths is attributed to the impression the use of black powder and explosions made to the area residents who were unfamiliar with these advances in military warfare.

Following the second great siege of Corfu in 1716, the Venetians finally decided to rebuild the castle, although the local population had already moved to other places including villages on the highlands of Mount Pantokrator.

== Architecture ==
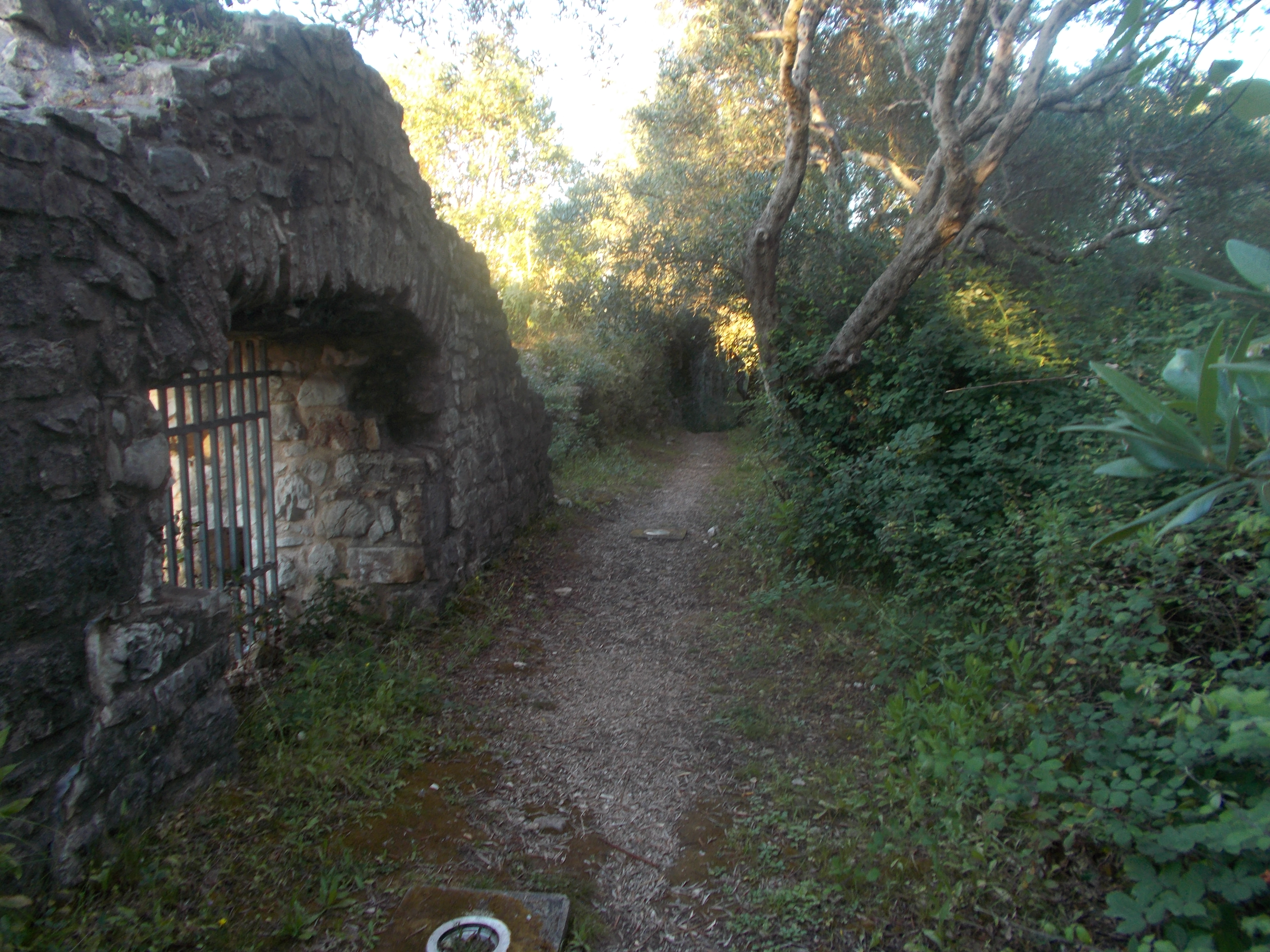
Gardens of Kassiopi Castle

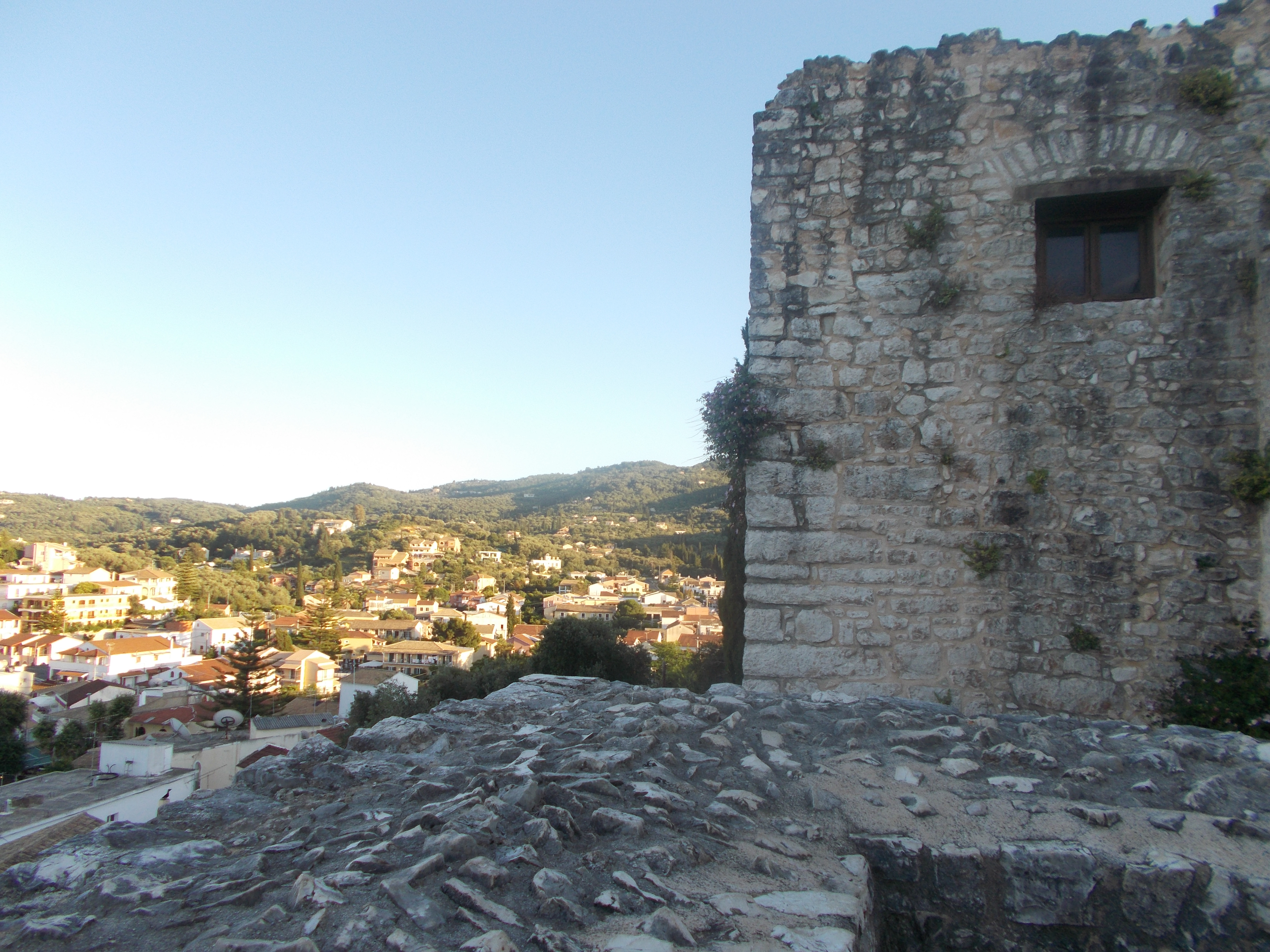
Kassiopi from the castle walls

The main gate of the castle is protected by strong fore-walls (Greek: προτειχίσματα). This arrangement is similar to other castles and structures found in Epirus, such as the Castle of Riza and the Monastery of Kato Vassiliki.

The perimeter of the castle has a length of 1.073 km and is of a quadrilateral shape with 19 strong towers of alternating circular and rectangular cross sections guarding the walls and runs in the southwest to northeast direction. The interior of the castle has an area of 35,177 m^{2} and is empty of any structures although filled with olive trees. The central tower of the castle has disappeared but the main gate exists and is supported by two strong towers on either side.

Each of the gate towers has two floors and the gate features protective wall extensions which restrict access from the sides, a feature which is designed to prevent surprise ambush from an enemy hiding at the side of the gate. The ambush avoidance feature is further augmented by the terrain which slopes upward at the gate. The thickness of the wall at the gate is 1.9 m. There are ruins of a forewall in front of the gate which could have functioned as an installation of a large iron structure which would have secured the gate.

There are indications that both strong towers at each side of the gate had installations that facilitated the movement of the iron gate closure. The defence of the castle was mainly achieved through warfare from the battlements, although no battlement structures survive. The shape of the battlements is uncertain and although in artistic representations they look like the letter "M", it is still not known if that representation is simply the artist's imagination.

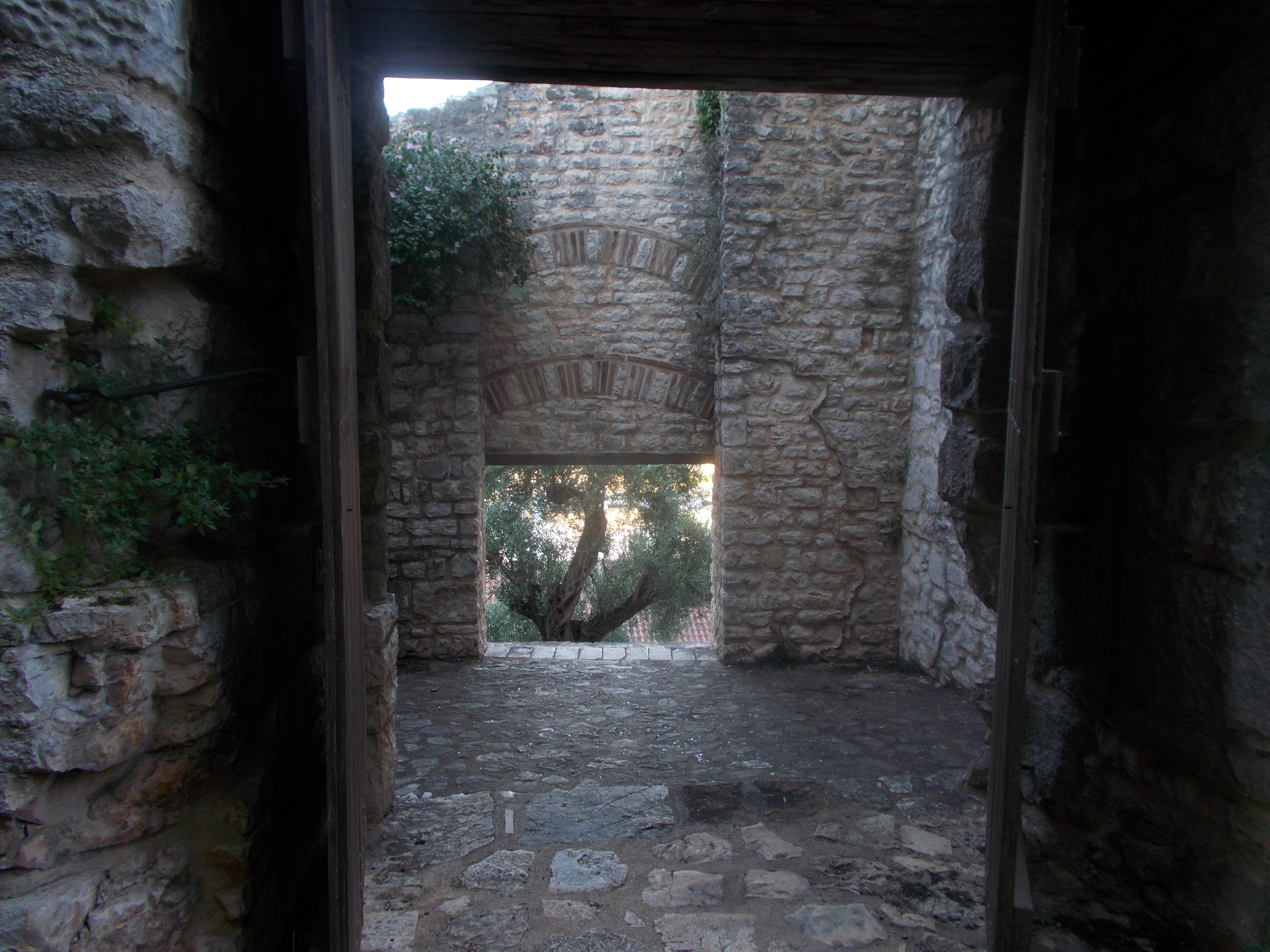
Rear view of the main gate complex

Since the walls of the castle are vertical, and not inclined so that cannon projectiles could bounce off them, the design was meant to repulse conventional siege machinery developed prior to the advent of artillery. Such conventional equipment would have included ladders, siege towers, and battering rams. The overall design of the castle is modest and characteristic of its provincial origin. The rectangular towers are older than the cylindrical ones and there are indications that the technology of the cylindrical towers may have been belatedly introduced to the fortress, given its rural and provincial location.

Since the castle was abandoned for a long time, its structure is in a state of ruin. The eastern side of the fort has disappeared and only a few traces of it remain. There are indications that castle stones have been used as building material for houses in the area. Access to the fortress is mainly from the southeast through a narrow walkway which includes passage from homes and backyards, since the castle is at the centre of the densely built area of the small village of Kassiopi.
