= High School of Kassiopi =

Location
- Kassiopi, Corfu, 49100; Greece
- Coordinates: 39.787797°N 19.909553°E

Information
- Type: Public school
- Established: 1996
- Headteacher: Konstantis Napoleon
- Gender: Mixed
- Age: 11 to 18
- Enrollment: 160
- Website: http://gym-kassiop.ker.sch.gr/

The High School of Kassiopi (Γυμνάσιο Κασσιόπης με Λυκειακές Τάξεις), also known as Lyceum of Kassiopi or Gymnasio of Kassiopi, is a state-run public high school in the town of Kassiopi on the affluent north-east coast of Corfu, Greece.

The school has a non-selective intake, admitting boys and girls between the ages of 11 and 18. It has around 160 students and over 20 teachers.

It provides both stages of Greek secondary education comprising both a gymnasio (junior/middle high school) and a general lykeion.

It is located above the harbour of Imerolia in the western part of Kassiopi.

The school is often the target of public dispute in the area due to its short supply of teachers and yearly school lockdowns by the students themselves.
