= Angelokastro (Corfu) =

Byzantine castle on the island of Corfu, Greece

- Αγγελόκαστρο
- Part of Byzantine Defences of Corfu
- Corfu, Ionian Islands, Greece
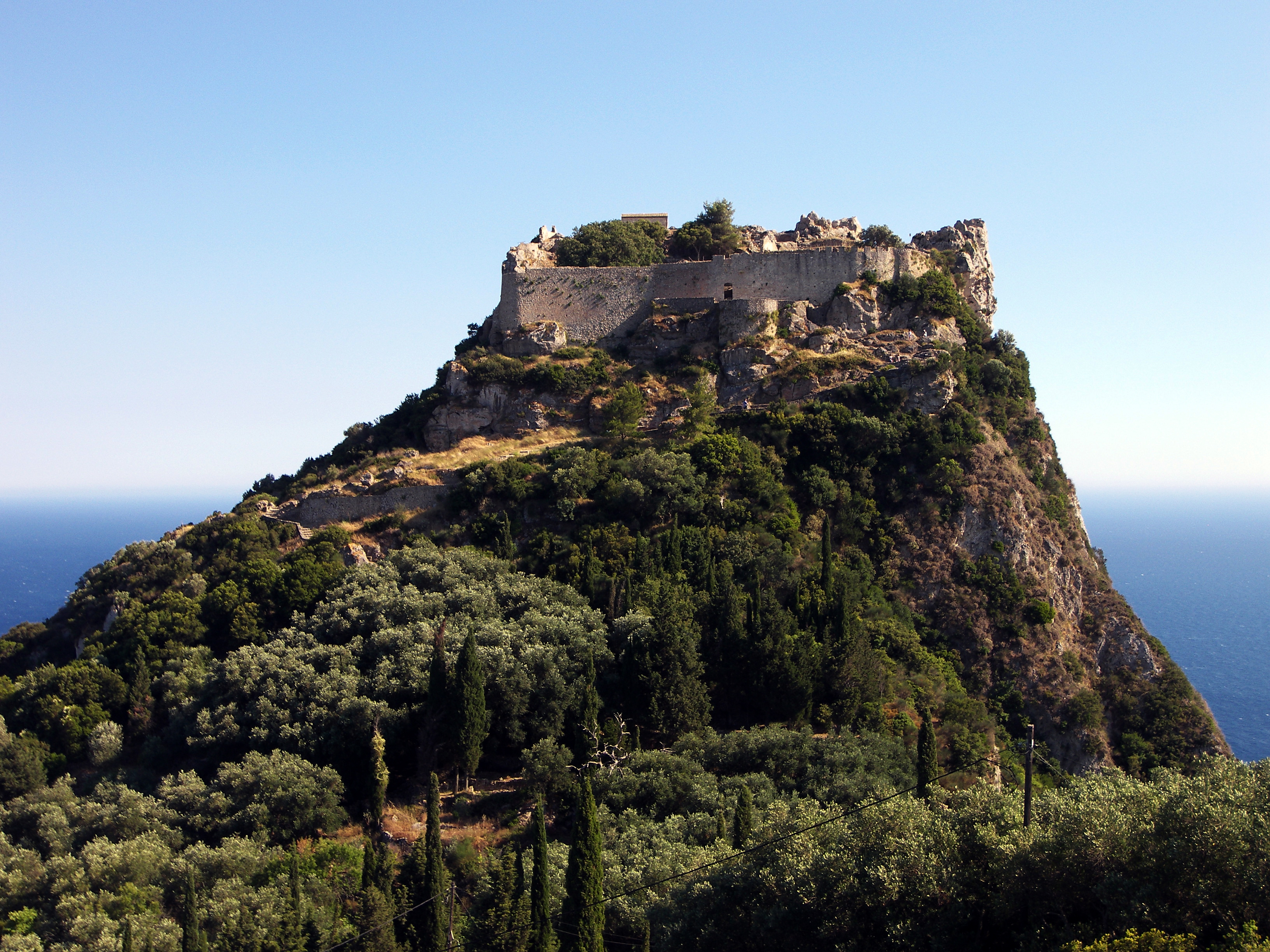
- Front view of Angelokastro approaching from the nearby village of Krini. Archangel Michael's church at the Acropolis can be seen at the top left of the castle. The Ionian Sea can be seen in the background. Remnants of the battlements can be seen on the right (northeast) side of the castle. The circular protective tower can be seen in front of the main gate.

Site information
- Type: citadel
- Owner: Greece Greek Ministry of Culture
- Controlled by: Byzantine Empire 6th century–1081; Bohemund of Taranto 1081–1085; Byzantine Empire 1085-1267; Anjou 1267-1386; Republic of Venice 1386–1797; Corcyre 1797–1800; Septinsular Republic 1800–1807; First French Empire 1807–14; United States of the Ionian Islands 1815–64; Greece c. 1864
- Open to the public: Yes
- Condition: Ruin

Location
- Coordinates: 39.6784°N 19.6872°E

Site history
- Built: 5th-7th Century?
- Built by: Unknown
- Materials: hewn stone (ashlar)
- Events: Siege of Corfu (1716)

Angelokastro (Greek: Αγγελόκαστρο (Castle of Angelos or Castle of the Angel); Venetian: Castel Sant'Angelo) is a Byzantine castle on the island of Corfu, Greece. It is located at the top of the highest peak of the island's shoreline in the northwest coast near Palaiokastritsa and built on particularly precipitous and rocky terrain. It stands 1,000 ft (305 m) on a steep cliff above the sea and surveys the City of Corfu and the mountains of mainland Greece to the southeast and a wide area of Corfu toward the northeast and northwest.

Angelokastro is one of the most important fortified complexes of Corfu. It was an acropolis which surveyed the region all the way to the southern Adriatic and presented a formidable strategic vantage point to the occupant of the castle. Angelokastro formed a defensive triangle with the castles of Gardiki and Kassiopi, which covered Corfu's defences to the south, northwest and northeast. The castle never fell, despite frequent sieges and attempts at conquering it through the centuries, and played a decisive role in defending the island against pirate incursions and during three sieges of Corfu by the Ottomans, significantly contributing to their defeat. During invasions, it helped shelter the local peasant population. The villagers also fought against the invaders playing an active role in the defence of the castle.

The exact period of the building of the castle is not known, but it has often been attributed to the reigns of Michael I Komnenos and his son Michael II Komnenos. The first documentary evidence for the fortress dates to 1272, when Giordano di San Felice took possession of it for Charles of Anjou, who had seized Corfu from Manfred, King of Sicily in 1267.

From 1387 to the end of the 16th century, Angelokastro was the official capital of Corfu and the seat of the Provveditore Generale del Levante, governor of the Ionian islands and commander of the Venetian fleet, which was stationed in Corfu. The governor of the castle (the castellan) was normally appointed by the City council of Corfu and was chosen amongst the noblemen of the island.

Angelokastro is considered one of the most imposing architectural remains in the Ionian Islands, along with Kassiopi Castle, Gardiki Castle and the two Venetian Fortresses of Corfu City, the Citadel and the New Fort.

== Name ==
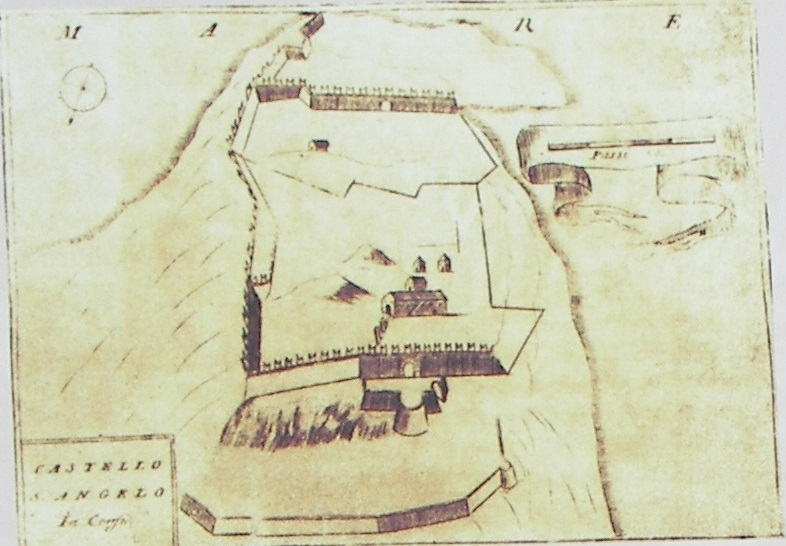
Old map of Angelokastro with the name Castello S. Angelo

The name may be related to the Komnenoi Angeloi, Despots of Epirus. The earliest textual reference to the castle is in an Angevin document of 1272, which refers to it as Castrum Sancti Angeli or Castrum S. Angeli, 'Castle of the Holy Angel'. Venetian documents of the 17th century call it Castel or Castello Sant' Angelo.

== History ==
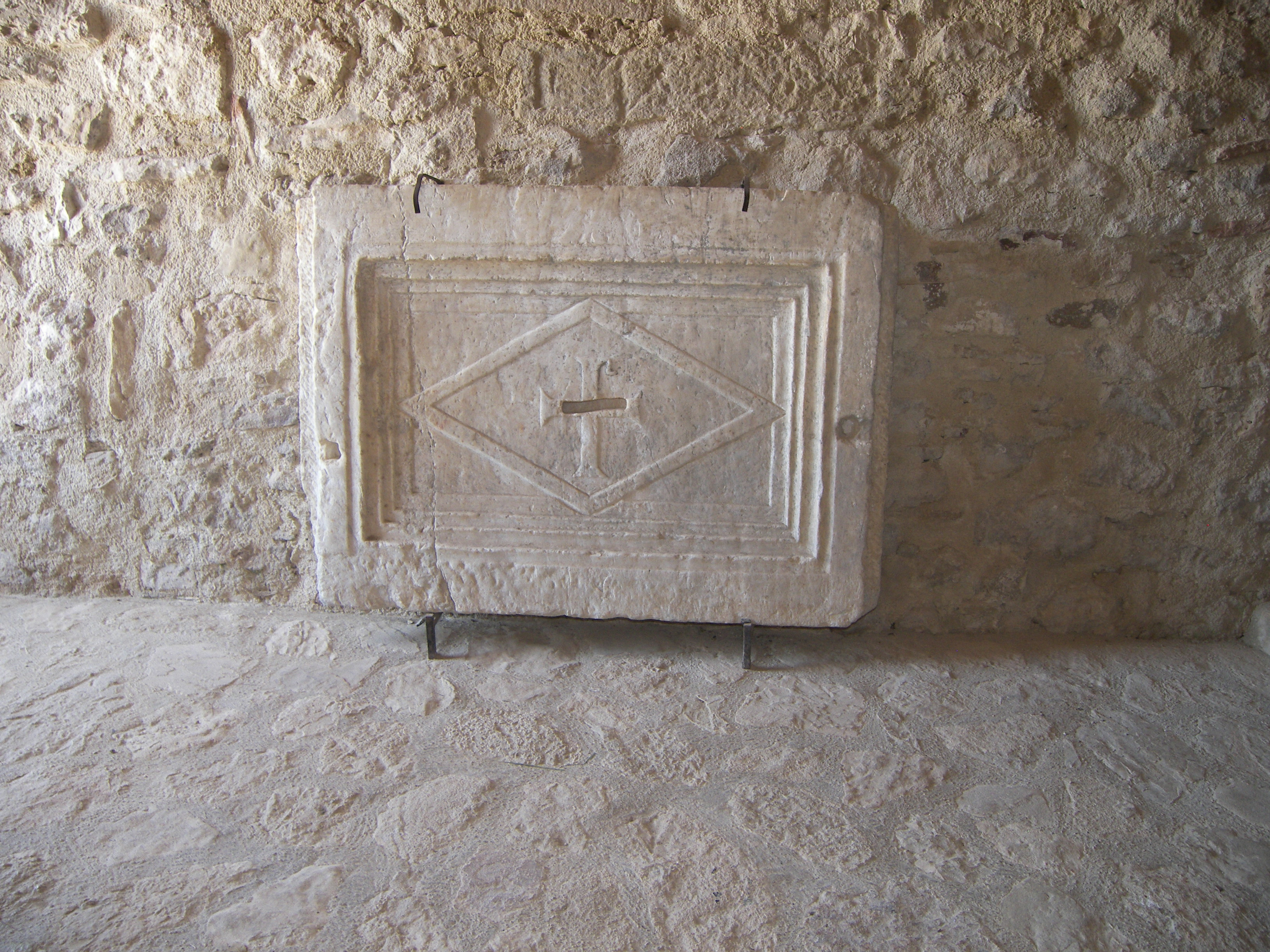
The larger of the two early-Christian closure slabs, found inside the Church of Archangel Michael with a Byzantine cross. The slab was part of the sculpted balustrade of an earlier Basilica.

Angelokastro is one of the most important fortified complexes of Corfu. It forms an acropolis that surveyed the region all the way to the southern Adriatic and therefore presented a formidable strategic vantage point to the occupant of the castle. Situated at an impregnable and strategic position, Angelokastro became important to the island's fortunes for many centuries.

Angelokastro was one of three castles which defended the island before the Venetian era (1401–1797). The castles formed a defensive triangle, with Gardiki Castle guarding the island's south, Kassiopi Castle the northeast and Angelokastro the northwest.

In peacetime it was also a centre of commerce and development. One of the reasons the castle was built was to defend Corfu against piracy and warn Corfu city of any approaching danger.

The city of Corfu lies to the southeast of the Castle and it is visible from Angelokastro. The garrison at the fortress would signal to the city the approach of any enemy.

=== Byzantine era ===
During excavations in 1999 by the 8th Ephorate of Byzantine Antiquities of Greece, two Early Christian closure slabs and other findings were unearthed at the top of the acropolis indicating that the site was occupied and perhaps fortified by the early Byzantine period between 5th-7th century AD.

Byzantine ruins were found at the Patima location near Angelokastro, indicating a settlement in the area whose population could have used fortifications on the Angelokastro hill during times of crisis.

After Byzantium lost its dominion over southern Italy in 1071, Corfu became the new Byzantine frontier to the West serving to separate Byzantium from its enemies to the west, making the island strategic to the Komnenoi who had the incentive to build fortifications to safeguard Corfu from the frequent invasions of the Norman Kingdom of Sicily, which had caused continuing upheaval in the island.

The exact time of the building of the castle is not known. and there are estimates that it was built during the reign of Manuel I Komnenos, or by Michael I Komnenos Doukas also known as Michael I Angelos, the Despot of Epirus, who took Corfu in 1214. His son Michael II Angelos, further fortified the area of the castle, and there is mention of him as the builder of the fortress.

Following the takeover of Constantinople by the Crusaders in 1204, Corfu was governed by a variety of rulers, including the Despots of Epirus, until 1267 when it was occupied by the Angevins of Naples.

=== Angevins ===
In 1272 Giordano di San Felice took ownership of the fortress on behalf of Charles I of Naples, king of the Angevins. The Angevins occupied Corfu from 1267 to 1386 and a document related to their takeover of the fortress is the earliest written record attesting to the existence of the castle.

In 1386, after the violent death of king Charles III of Naples, the occupants of the castle, still loyal to Charles' successor king Ladislaus of Naples, resisted for a brief time the Venetian takeover but the transfer of power to the Venetians occurred with virtually no loss of life.

=== Venetian rule ===
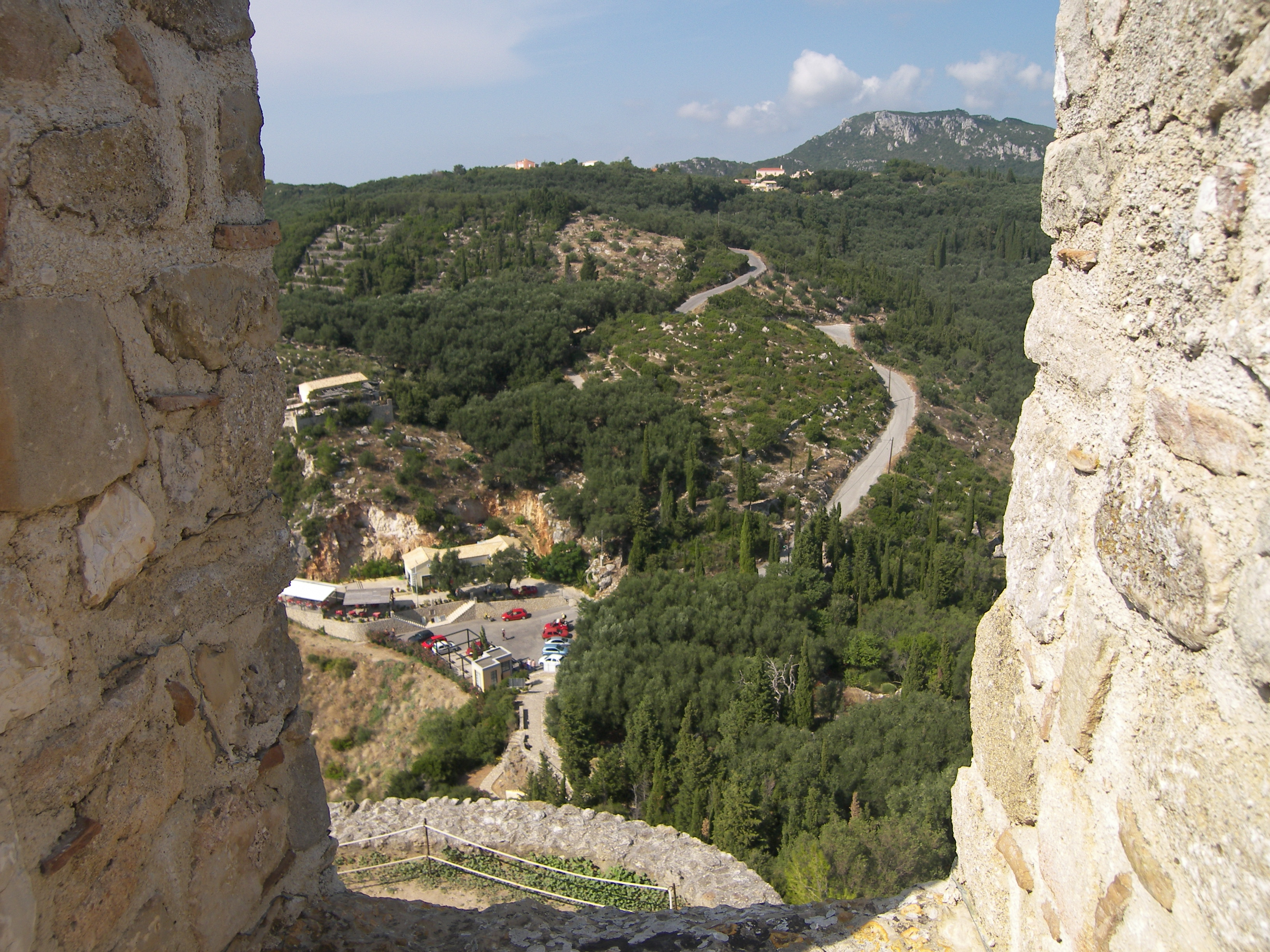
View from the battlements

Before the Venetians conquered Corfu, there were three castles which defended the island from attacks: Kassiopi Castle in the northeast of the island, Angelokastro, defending the northwest side of Corfu, and Gardiki in the south of the island.

In 1386, with the departure of the Angevins, the castle came under the ownership of the Most Serene Republic of Venice (Venetian: Serenìsima Repùblica Vèneta).

A special Venetian officer assumed the responsibility for Angelokastro, a strong castle which never fell, despite frequent attempts to conquer it. Under the dominion of Venice, Corfu was defended throughout the period of her occupation. However invasions and associated destruction still occurred during this time, especially at the undefended areas of the island. The Venetians, being the prominent maritime power of the era, used Angelokastro to monitor the shipping lanes in the southern Adriatic and the Ionian Sea.

Throughout the period of Venetian rule the castle enjoyed great prominence because it offered protection to the locals from foes such as the Genoan pirates to the west as well as the Ottomans to the east. Neither the Genoans nor the Ottomans were ever able to penetrate its defences. In 1403, a Genoese fleet carrying a force of about 10,000 Genoan mercenaries landed at Palaiokastritsa. The Genoans were on their way to the Holy Land to take part in the crusades and they were under the command of French marshal Jean Le Maingre known as Boucicault.

Following their landing, they laid siege to Angelokastro for a year. The Genoans burned and pillaged the surrounding area. Then they attempted to occupy the castle. After furious battles with the Corfiot garrison, under the leadership of a Corfiote nobleman, they were ultimately repulsed.

In 1406, the Venetian Senate received a petition by Corfiote representatives to Venice under the capitoli, i.e. political privileges granted by Venice to Corfu upon entering the Venetian state, who had asked that positions of public officials in Corfu be filled locally for a year.

Two years later, in 1408, the Senate replied and informed the local government of Corfu that certain public positions such as the comestabelaria, the Castellan or Governor of Angelokastro, the Castellan of Porto Ferro, and the salt official were exempt from the capitoli and they were to be filled by the Venetian bailo.

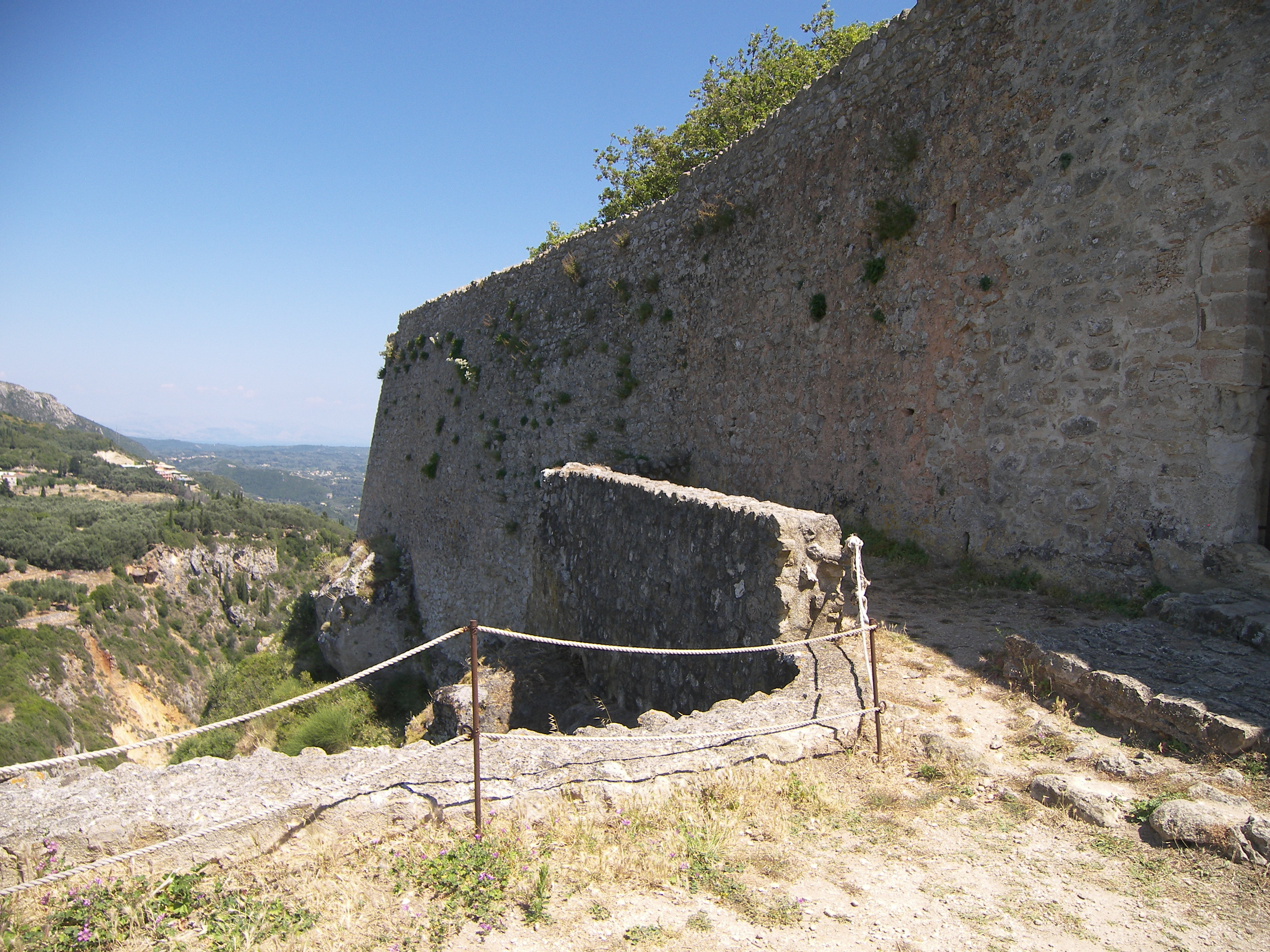
Southeast side of Angelokastro. The city of Corfu is located to the southeast of the walls.

Later, the Corfiote representations to Venice succeeded in their demands that the Castellan of Angelokastro be appointed locally by the city of Corfu. Subsequently, the Castellan was chosen amongst the noblemen of the island.

Occasionally, the Venetians provided funds for the repair and maintenance of old rural castles such as Angelokastro as a means of protecting the peasants and their livestock during times of crisis. The Venetians applied a similar policy to the old castles located in the mountain ranges of northern Cyprus.

From 1387 until late in the sixteenth century, Angelokastro was the capital of Corfu and, in early sixteenth century, became the seat of the Provveditore Generale del Levante, who was the governor of the Ionian Islands and also the commander of the Venetian fleet which was stationed in Corfu.

==== Ottoman sieges ====
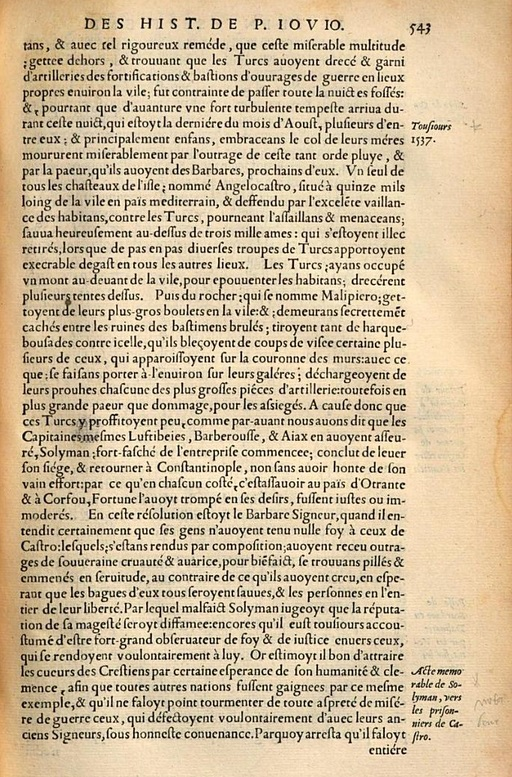
Reference to Angelokastro during the first great siege of Corfu in 1537, in the History of Paolo Giovio published in 1555. Giovio spells it "Angelocastro".

Angelokastro was instrumental in repulsing the Ottomans in three sieges of Corfu: in the first great siege of Corfu in 1537, in the siege of 1571 and the second Great Siege of Corfu in 1716.

In 1537, during the first great siege of Corfu, Suleyman the Magnificent dispatched a force of 25,000 men under the command of admiral Hayreddin Barbarossa to attack Corfu. The Ottomans landed at Govino Bay, present day Gouvia, and proceeded toward Corfu town, destroying the village of Potamos as they made their way toward the City. The Old Fort, Corfu city's only fortification during that period, and Angelokastro were the only two places on the island not in the hands of the invaders at the time.

In undefended parts of the island, people where killed or taken away as slaves by the army of the Sultan.

Even at the Old Fortress in the City of Corfu, the weaker segments of the civilian population, women, children and the elderly, called the inutili (useless) by the Venetians, were not allowed to enter the fort and were forced to remain outside its walls. The Ottomans killed many among them or enslaved them. The rejection of the people at the gates, and its consequences, angered the Corfiots who lost faith in Venice's defensive measures. When the Ottomans attacked Angelokastro, 3,000 villagers had retreated inside the safety of the walls of the castle. The invading army was repulsed four times by the Corfiote garrison and was unable to breach the defences of the castle.

In the account of the Ottoman invasion contained in the History of Paolo Giovio published in 1555, the author mentions Angelokastro, out of all the other castles of Corfu, and praises the bravery of its defenders. As it was retreating from Corfu, the Ottoman army devastated the undefended areas of both Corfu city and the island. In total about 20,000 people who were unable to find shelter in either castle were either killed or taken away as slaves.

In August 1571, the Ottomans made another of many attempts at conquering Corfu. Having seized Parga and Mourtos from the Greek mainland side they attacked the Paxi islands, landing a force there. Subsequently, they landed on Corfu's southeast shore and established a large beachhead all the way from the southern tip of the island at Lefkimmi to Ipsos in Corfu's midsection of the eastern part of the island. These areas were thoroughly pillaged and burnt as in past encounters.

An Ottoman force, on its way to the city, first occupied and destroyed the village of Potamos. Although the Corfu city castle stood firm, the rest of Corfu was destroyed and the general population outside the castles was defenceless and suffered heavy casualties, while homes, churches and public buildings were burned in the city suburbs.

Admiral Kilich Ali Pasha was dispatched to Corfu by the Ottoman Empire as head of an invasion force in 1571 and deployed two-thirds of his men to lay siege to and attempt to conquer Angelokastro, while the rest of his army attacked the city of Corfu.

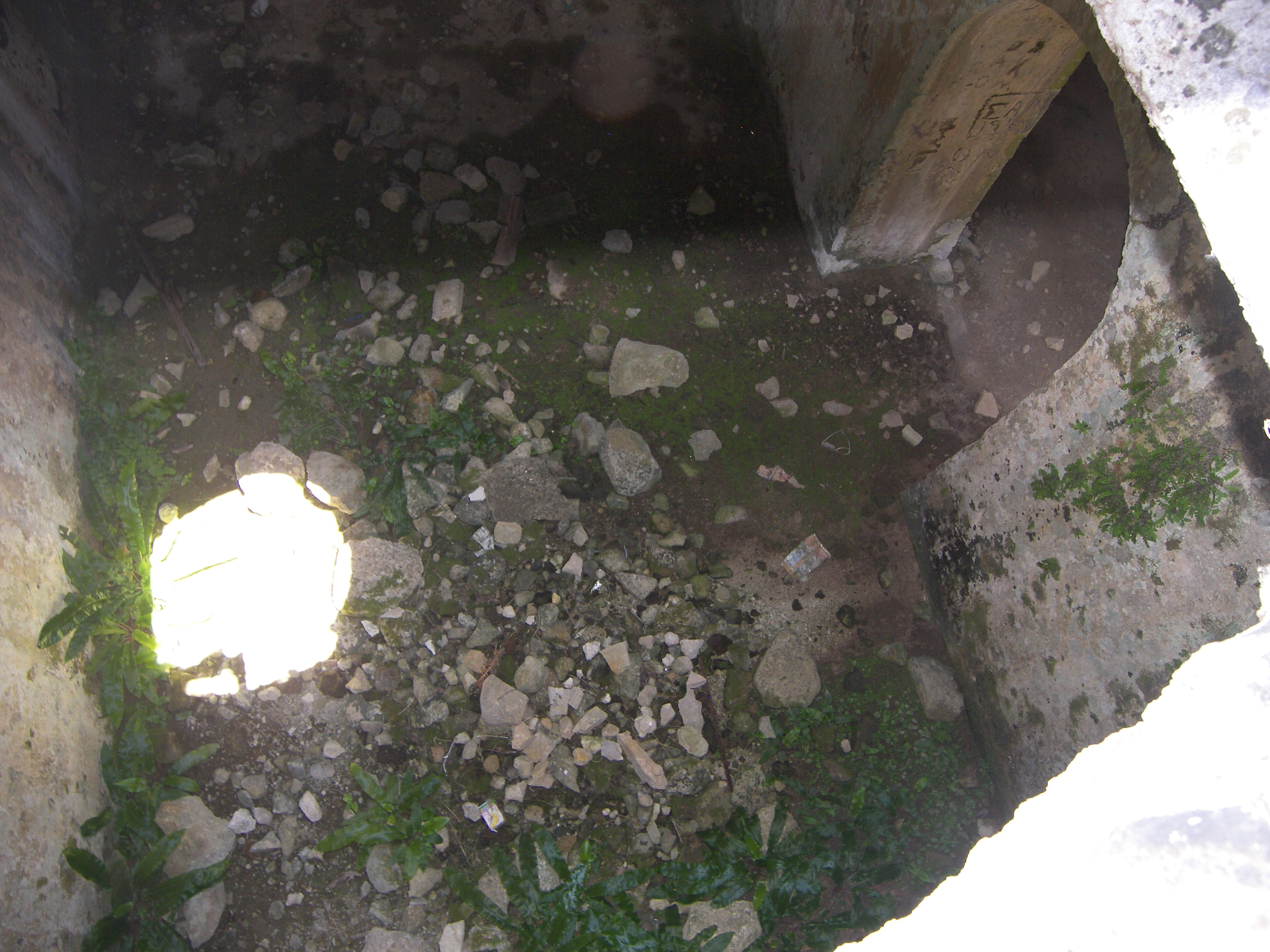
Detail of the underground arched cistern of Angelokastro.

The Angelokastro garrison, composed of about 4,000 peasants from the nearby villages, successfully resisted the invading force and the Ottomans were not successful at establishing a beachhead in the northwestern flank of the island.

After their unsuccessful siege, the Ottoman army retreated from Angelokastro and they set a course for Corfu city through the mountains intent on continuing their siege of the city. The garrison of Angelokastro scuttled their plans by exiting the castle and rolling boulders at them as they were passing through the mountains. Following these events, Kilich ended the siege of the island destroying vineyards and fruit trees during his retreat, and finally departing with his fleet.

These Ottoman defeats both at the city castle in the east and Angelokastro in the west proved decisive and the Ottomans abandoned their attempts at conquering Corfu. Angelokastro protected the population of the region again during the second Great Siege of Corfu by the Ottomans in 1716.

=== Modern times ===
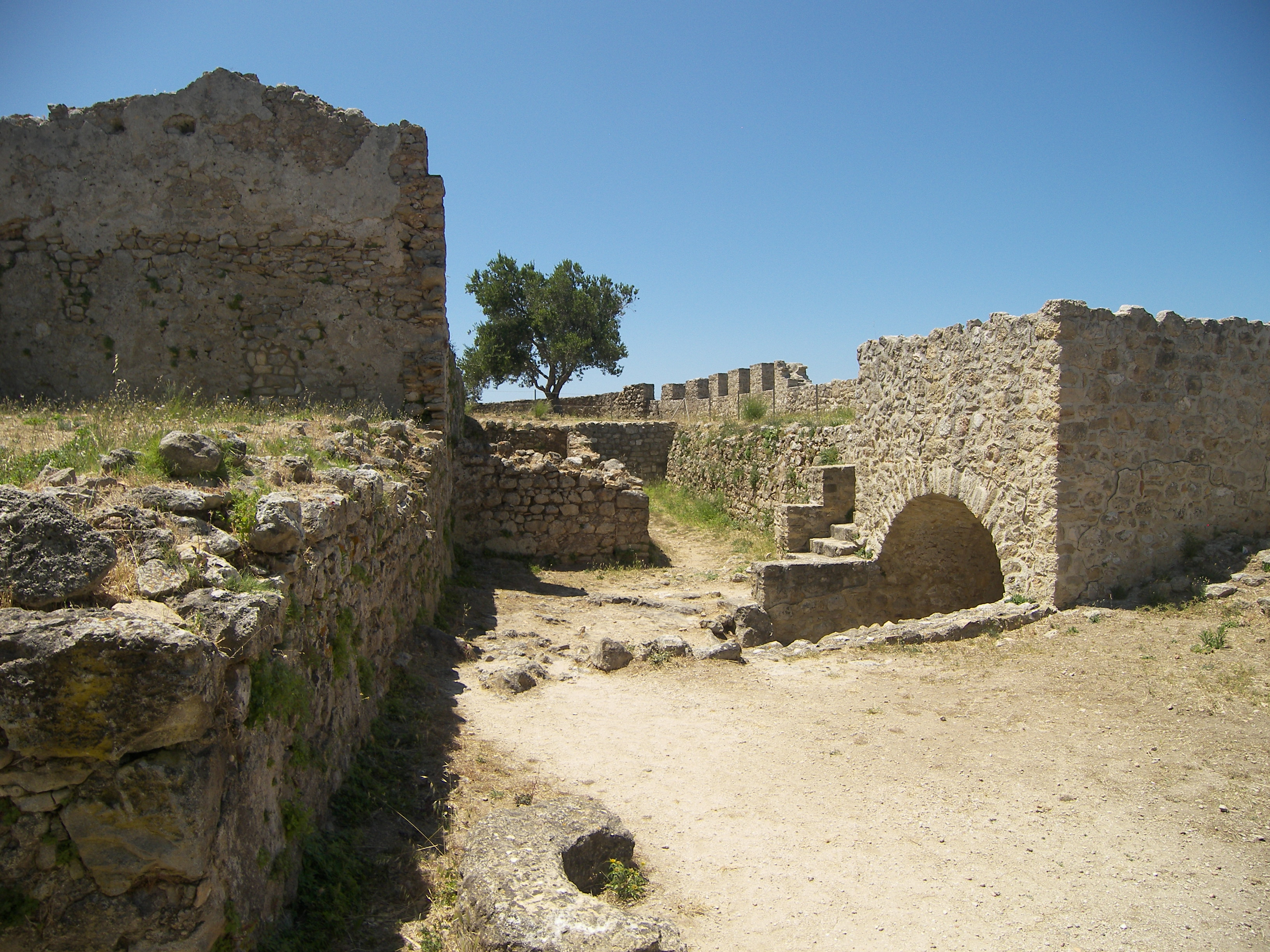
Ruins of Angelokastro

With the advent of modern warfare the castle's importance declined and gradually it fell into a state of disrepair. The passage of time did to the castle what no aspiring conqueror could. From 1999, however, the Corfu office of the 8th Ephorate of Byzantine Antiquities of Greece has undertaken a restoration programme under the co-sponsorship of the Greek Ministry of Culture and the European Union.

The castle was closed to the public for excavations and reconstruction starting in 1999. Since 2018 there is an entry fee of 2 euros. The castle is closed on Tuesdays.

== Architectural highlights ==
Angelokastro is considered one of the most imposing architectural remains in the Ionian Islands along with four other fortifications of Corfu such as Gardiki Castle, the Kassiopi Castle built by the Angevins and the two Venetian Fortresses of Corfu City, the Citadel and the New Fort.

The castle's west, northwest and south sides are protected by the terrain that slopes precipitously. Its foundation may have been Byzantine but, given its size, the incorporation of its extraordinary natural surroundings into the design of the fortifications is not typically Byzantine and follows the tradition of small but practically impregnable fortresses which incorporate outstanding natural elements into their design.

In contrast to the purely Byzantine style of Gardiki Castle which was also constructed in a single form, Angelokastro's architectural style may not have been purely Byzantine and could have been influenced by Frankish or South Italian architectural elements, although the details of such influence are not discernible today due to its current state of ruin.

French scholar Jean Alexandre Buchon, who visited the site in the 19th century, noted that the construction of its walls seemed rushed.

=== Church of the Acropolis ===
The acropolis is located at the highest point with a church at the southern side. The church is dedicated to Archangel Michael and it is built at the site of an Early Christian three-aisled church.

=== Circular tower ===
The main gate points to the north and is protected by a circular tower. The ruins opposite the main gate formed the garrison's quarters. There were three underground cisterns that supplied water to the castle occupants.

Battlements survive only on the northeastern side of the castle. A small gate also existed at the southern side.

=== Anthropomorphic graves ===
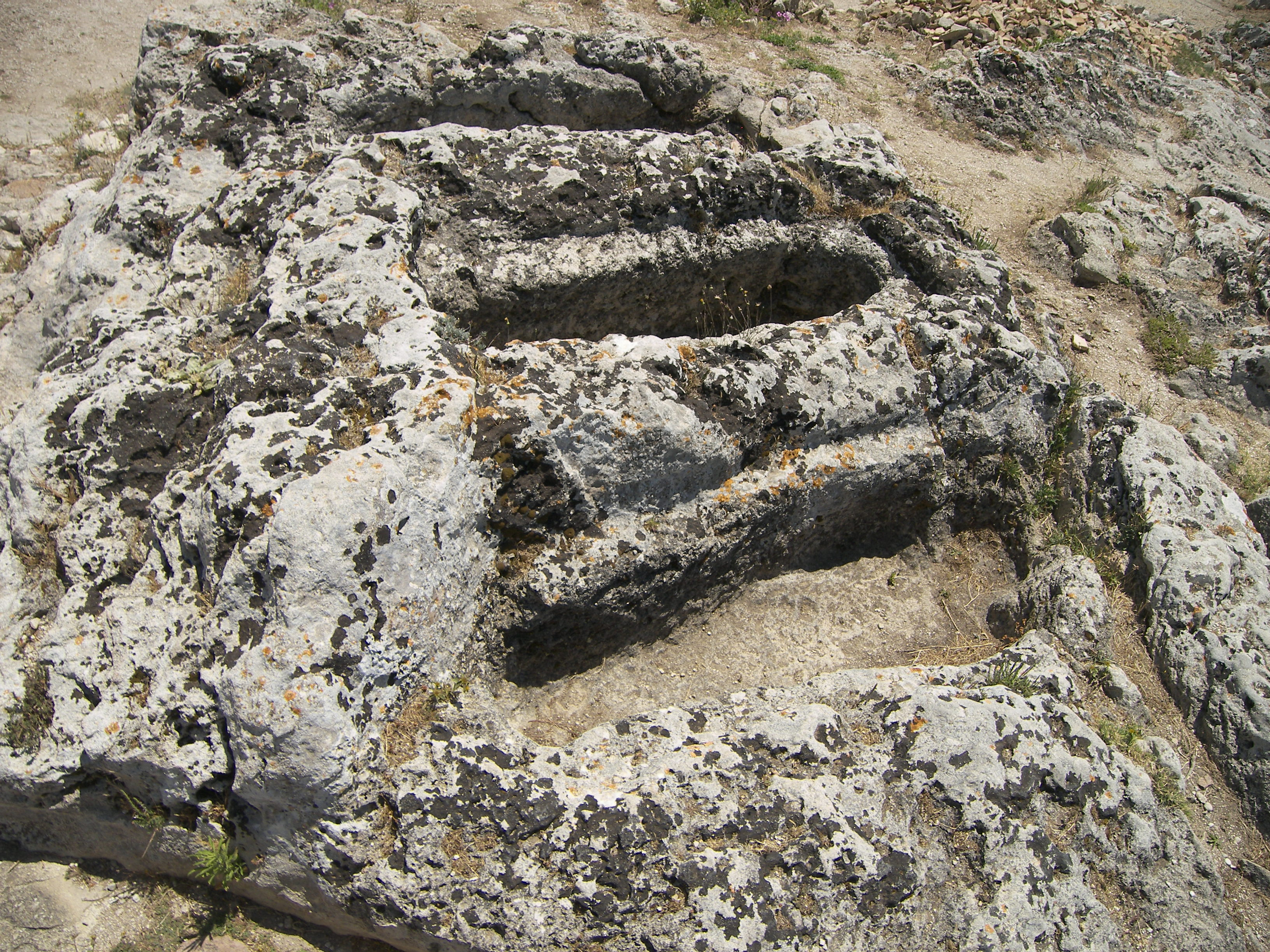
Anthropomorphic graves carved in stone

There is a cemetery on the western side with seven graves carved out of the rock in the shape of the human body as in a sarcophagus. The origin of the anthropomorphic graves has not yet been determined.

=== Chapel in the rock ===
At the east side there exists a tiny chapel, dedicated to St. Kyriaki, that also served as a hermitage. The chapel was created by digging into the rock formation and as such it is a cave-like structure. There are paintings inside the chapel that date back to the 18th century. A hermit also resided in the same area.

== Depictions in art ==
Edward Lear created a drawing of Angelokastro in one of his Views of the Ionian Islands.

== Gallery ==
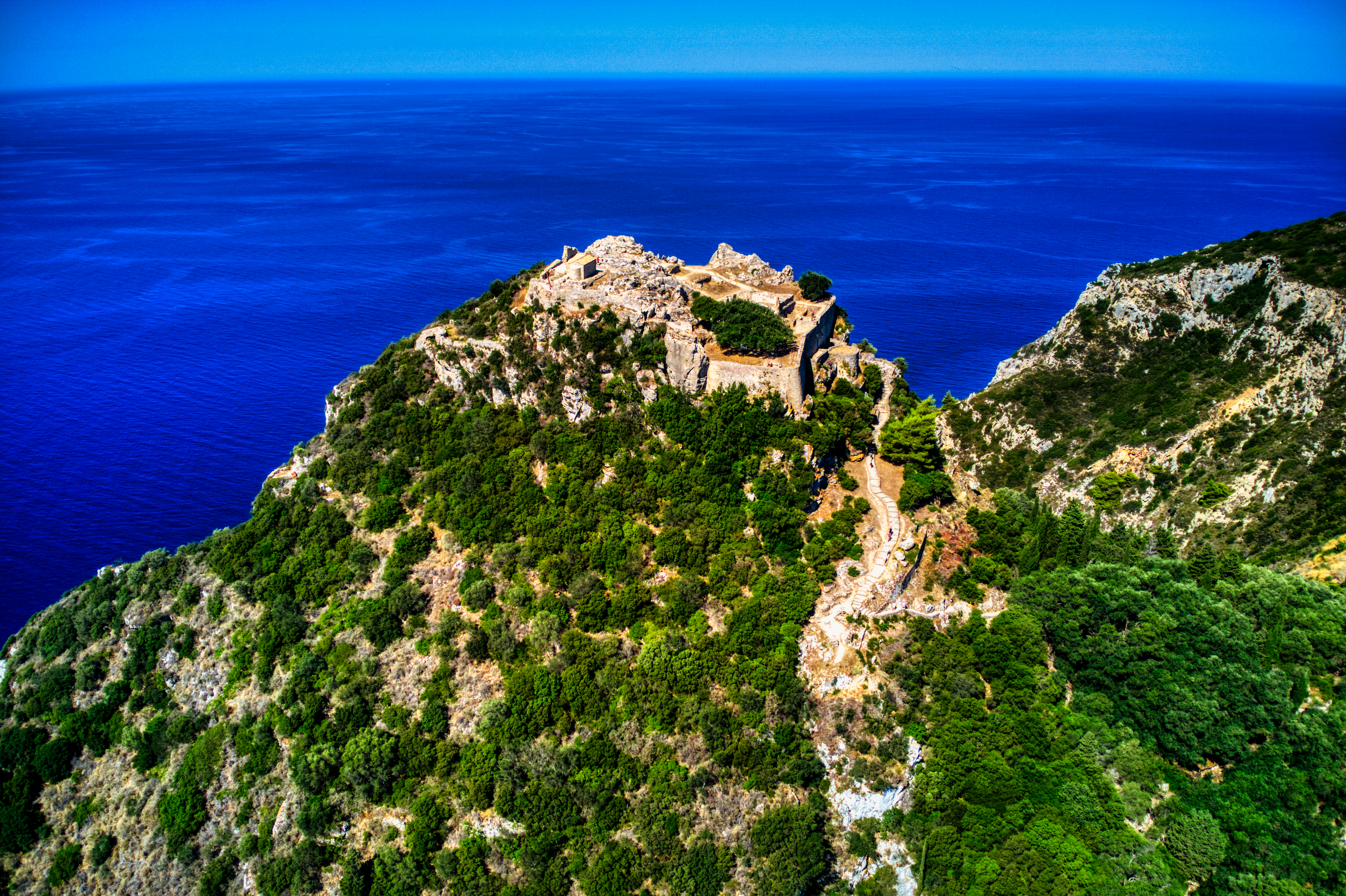
Angelokastro from above

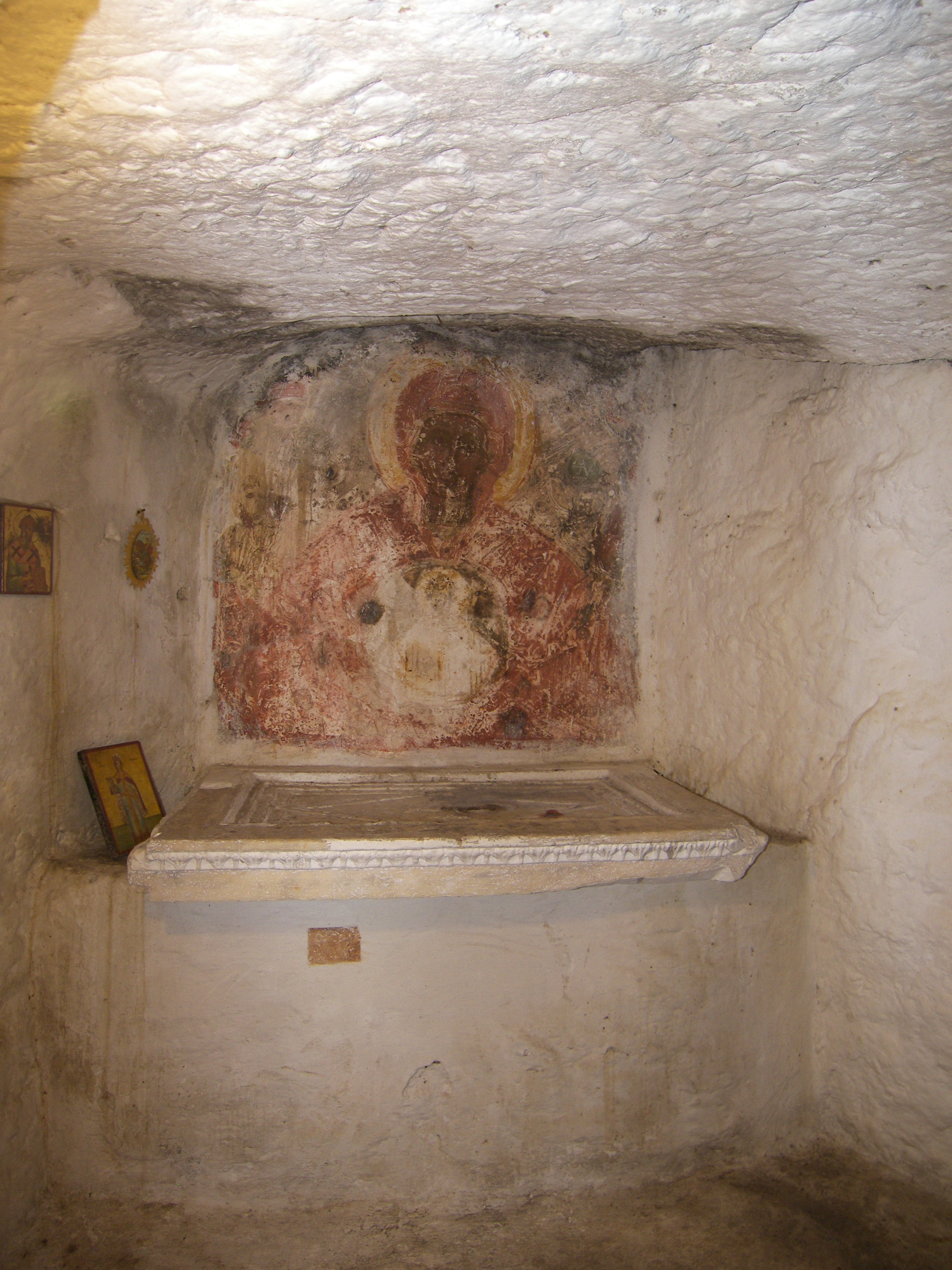
Interior of the altar of the Aghia Kyriaki stone Church at Angelokastro featuring the smaller of the two Early-Christian closure slabs as its altar stone

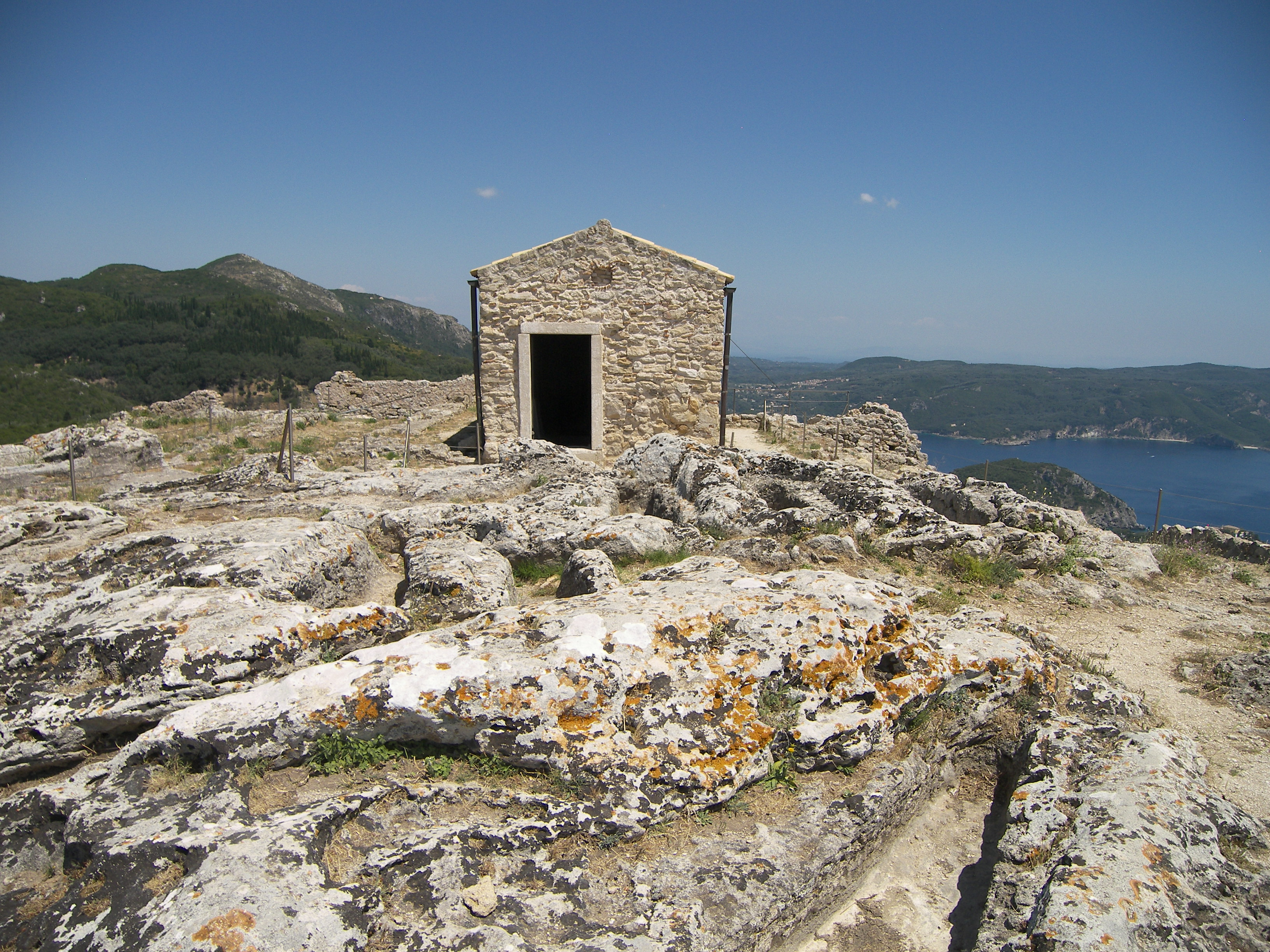
The church of Archangel Michael at Angelokastro with anthropomorphic graves at the foreground

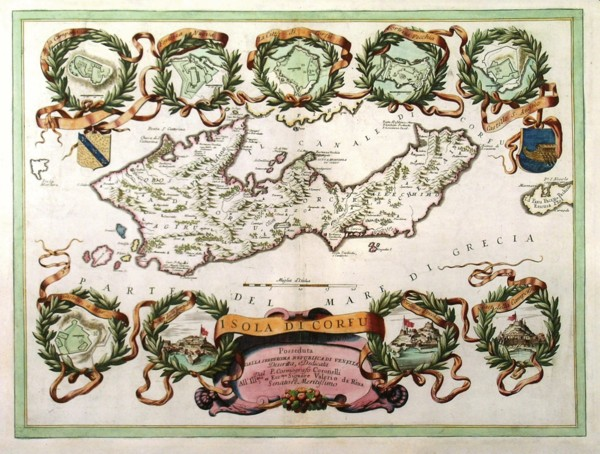
An old Venetian map of Isola di Corfu: posseduta dalla Serenissima Republica di Venetia ca. 1690 featuring the map of Angelokastro inside a wreath, amongst similar representations of the rest of the castles of Corfu. Angelokastro is indicated as "Castello S. Angelo" in a ribbon below the top right wreath of the map.

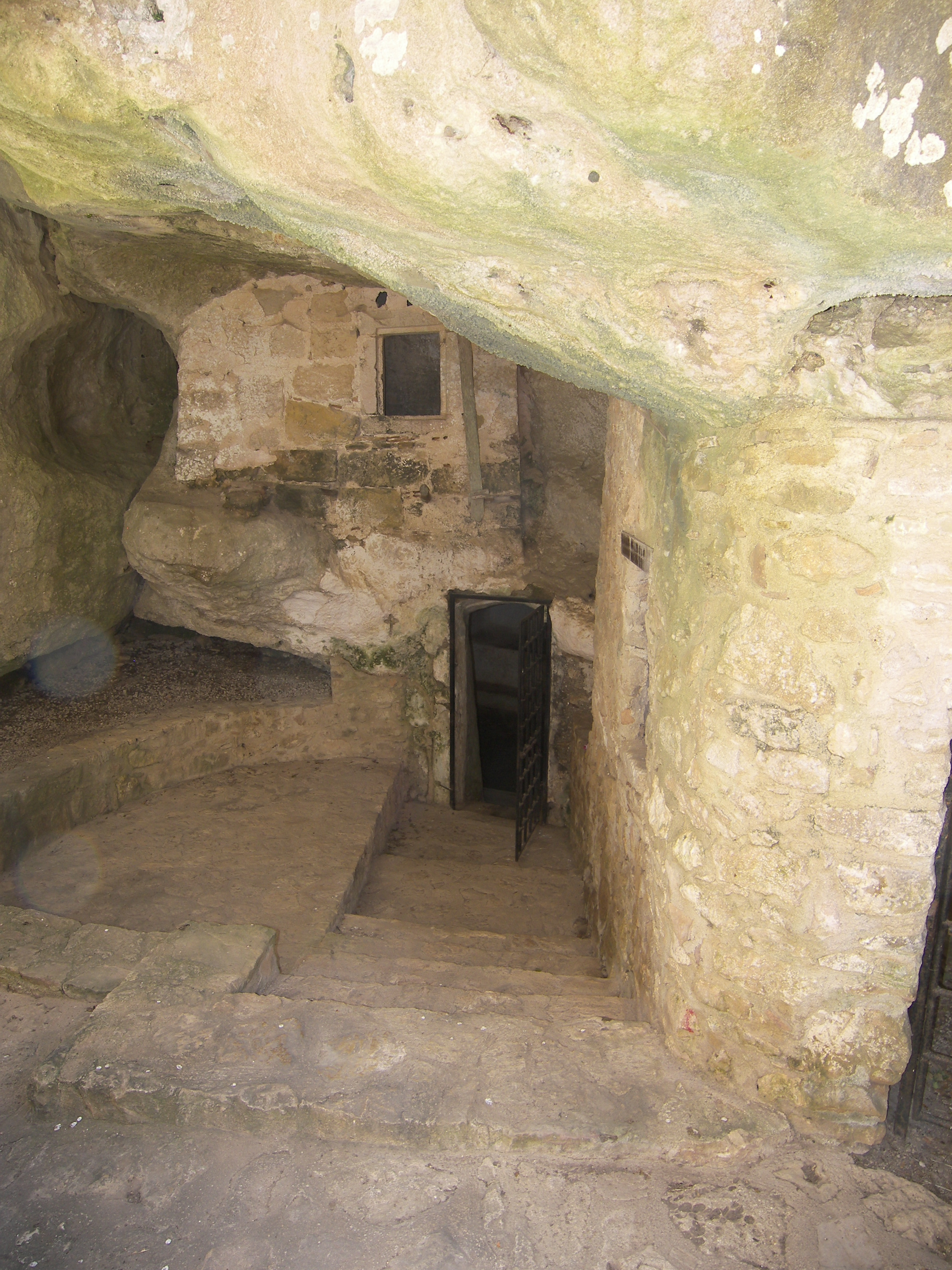
The exterior of the church of Aghia Kyriaki. The hermit's quarters are on the left of the church entrance

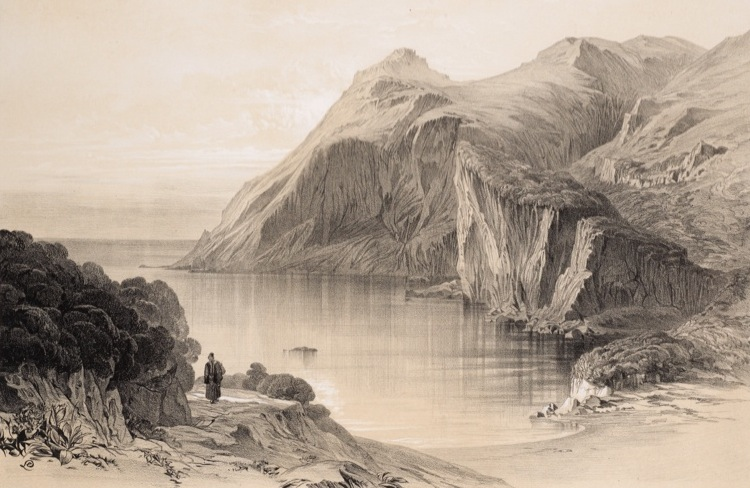
Castel Sant Angelo by Edward Lear

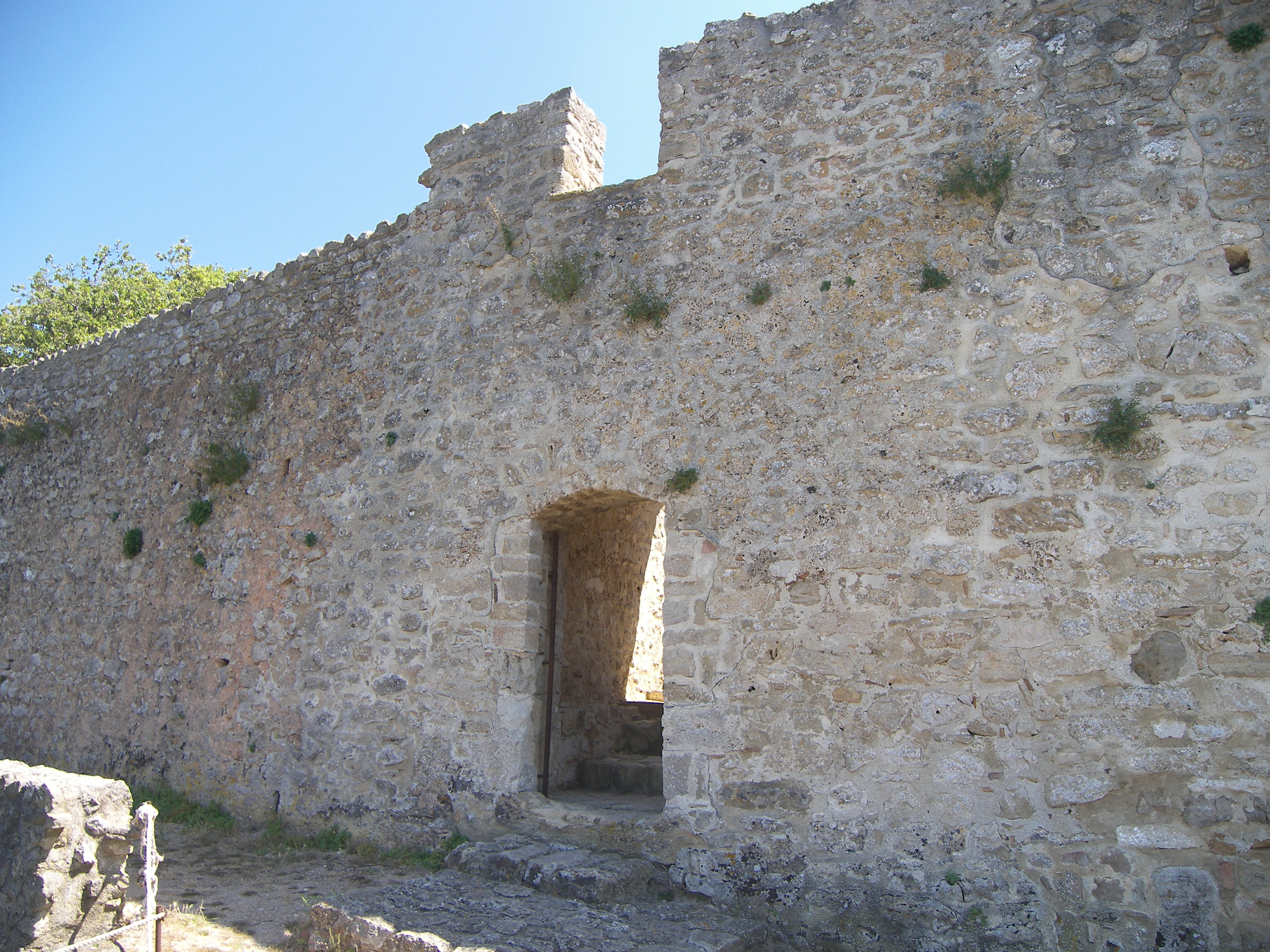
The Gate to Angelokastro

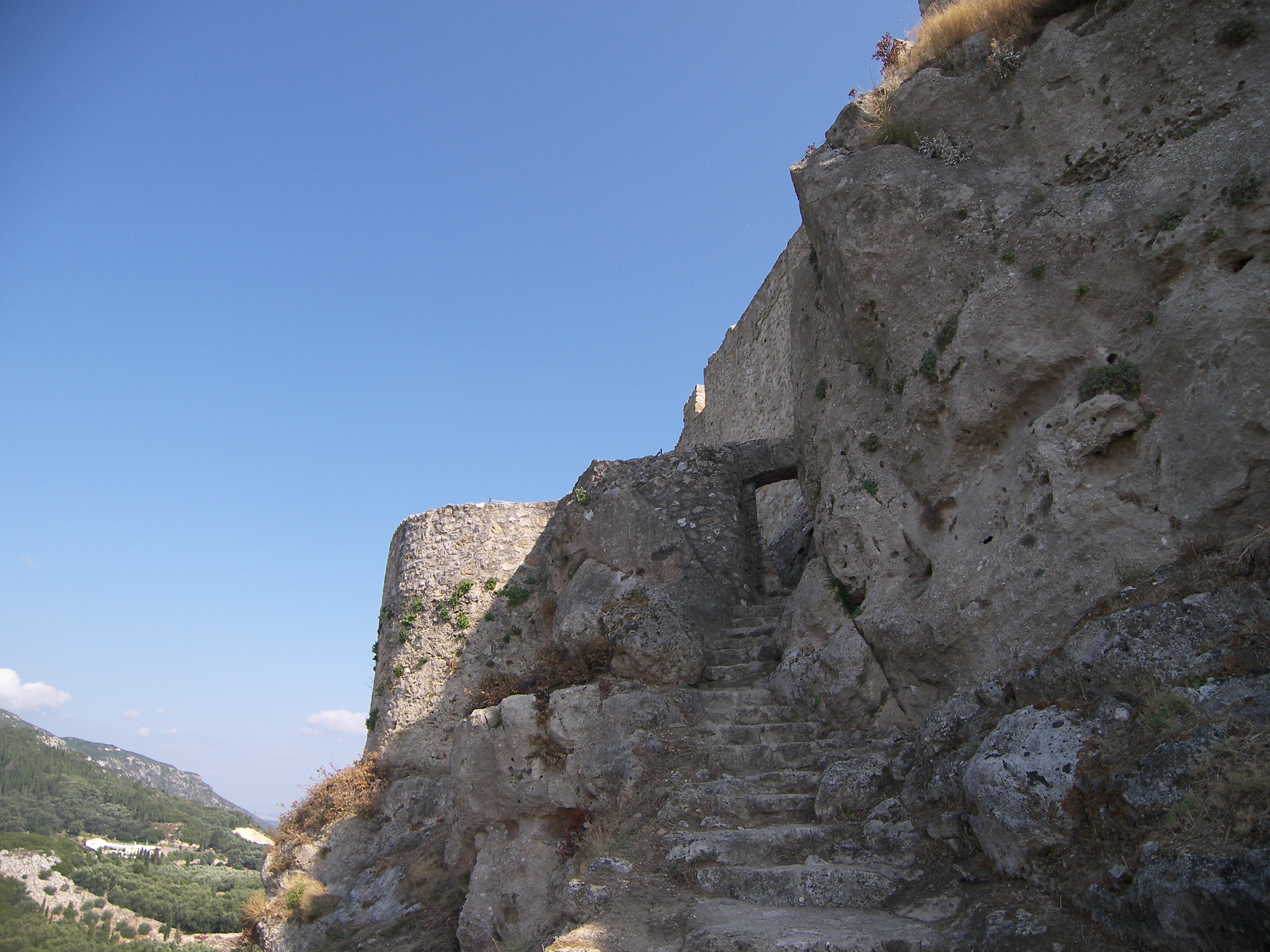
Anabasis to Angelokastro

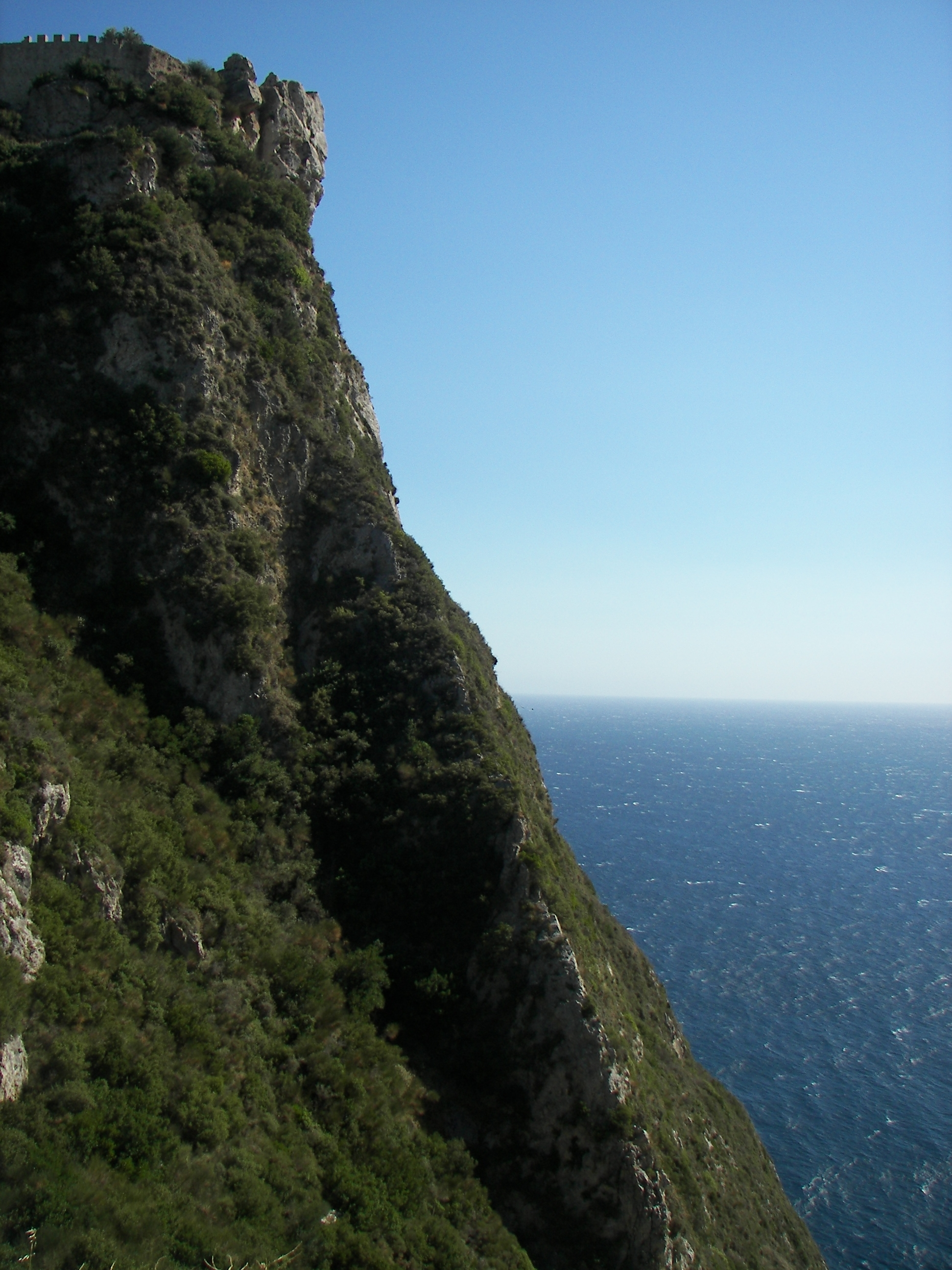
Northern side of Angelokastro. The precipitous nature of the terrain is apparent

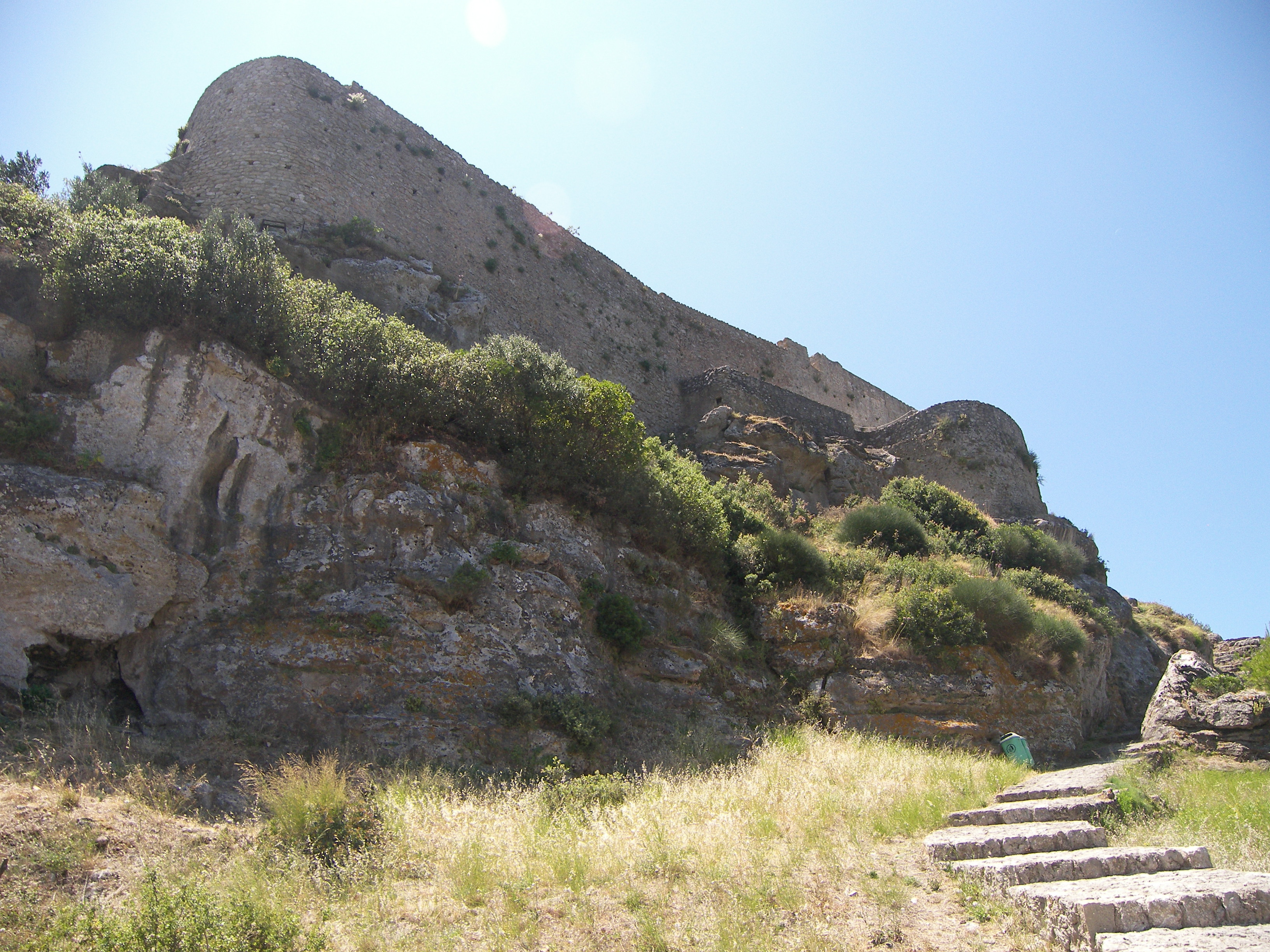
View of Angelokastro from below
