= Patras Experimental Lyceum =

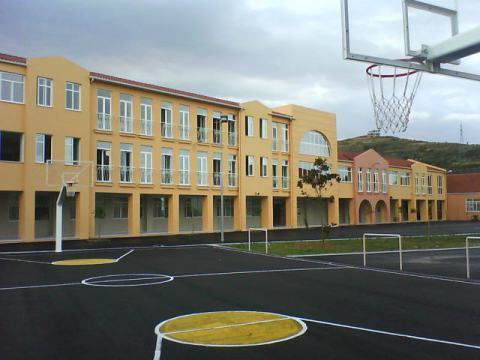
- Athletic facilities of Patras Experimental Lyceum in 2008

Location
- Patras; Greece

Information
- Type: Co-educational Public High School
- Established: 1972
- Principal: Ioannis Sfaelos
- Grades: 1-3
- Colour(s)
- Website: https://plppupatras.wixsite.com/plpp

The Patras Experimental Lyceum (Greek: Πειραματικό Λύκειο Πάτρας), colloquially referred to simply as Peiramatiko, is an experimental, co-educational, public lyceum (students aged 16–18). It is associated with the University of Patras since its foundation in 1972, and was transferred to within the university campus in 2008.

== Facilities ==
- Library
- Gymnasium
- Physics Lab
- Computer Lab
- Theater

== Students ==
The complex (the lyceum and the gymnasium put-together) has a number of 630 students approximately. The school gets 3/4 of its students from graduates of the gymnasium, and the other 1/4 is drawn before the beginning of the school year. The students are usually successful in the nationwide university entry exams because the school is the only public school in Greece, in which the Ministry of National Education chooses the teachers in order to meet special standards. Most of the teachers have a doctorate in their subject.

== Lessons ==
Most of the subjects are taught in Greek. There are some differences that the school has from other public lyceums in Greece. Students are free to choose from a variety of programmes including SAT, most of which carry out an excursion to another E.U. country. Students from abroad also visit the school). English is taught in levels ranging from 1 to 4, 4 being CPE level and 1 being basic English.
