= Sivitanideios School of Arts and Crafts =

Public school in Athens, Greece

Coordinates: 37.9606°N 23.6963°E

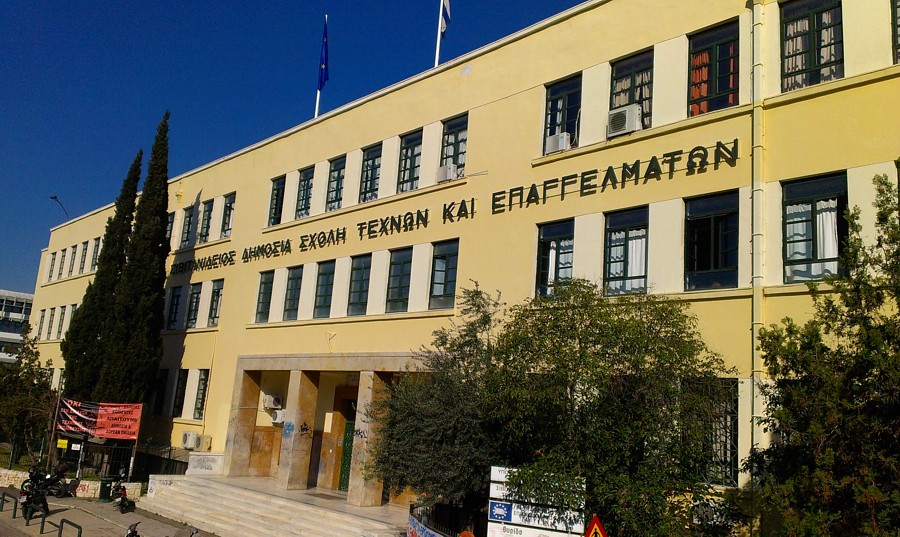
Front exterior of Sivitanideios School of Arts and Crafts in 2014

Sivitanideios School of Arts and Crafts is a public school in Athens, Greece. It is run jointly by the Ministry of Education (Greece) and the Greek Ministry of Labour's Manpower Employment Organisation of Greece (OAED).

The school first opened in 1926, and works on the building began after 1921, with money donated to the Greek state by Vassilis Sivitanidis, a Greek Cypriot merchant living in Alexandria, Egypt. It was meant to be a school comparable to France's École nationale supérieure d'arts et métiers (today called Arts et Métiers ParisTech), as its benefactor, Mr Sivitanidis, had stated in his will.

In 1929, the modern Greek philosopher and teacher Helle Lambridis becomes the Headmistress but leaves before the end of the academic year, towards the end of Spring 1930.
