= Costeas-Geitonas School =

Coordinates: 38.014°N 23.892°E

- Athens; Greece

Information
- Type: Private
- Established: 1981
- Status: Open
- Website: www.cgs.gr

Costeas-Geitonas School is a Greek private school which was founded in 1973. It is in Pallini, at the province of Attica, 30 minutes outside Athens. The school includes a kindergarten, elementary school, middle school and high-school (including an International Baccalaureate department). It is a day school which operates from 8:30 to 15:00. (Activities end at 17:00)

Costeas-Geitonas School has been an IB school since April 1994. The head of the school is Christos Geitonas. The school is open to male and female students and pupils at this school usually take IB and Greek Panhellenic exams in May and June of each year.

It is an official Juventus Soccer School and has organised its own MUN conference every year since 2006.

Costeas-Geitonas School has over 1,000 students and 1,300 staff, making it one of the biggest schools in Greece.
