= Gardiki Castle, Corfu =

13th-century Byzantine castle on the southwestern coast of Corfu, Greece

Gardiki Castle
- Κάστρο Γαρδικίου
- Part of Byzantine Defences of Corfu
- Corfu, Ionian Islands, Greece
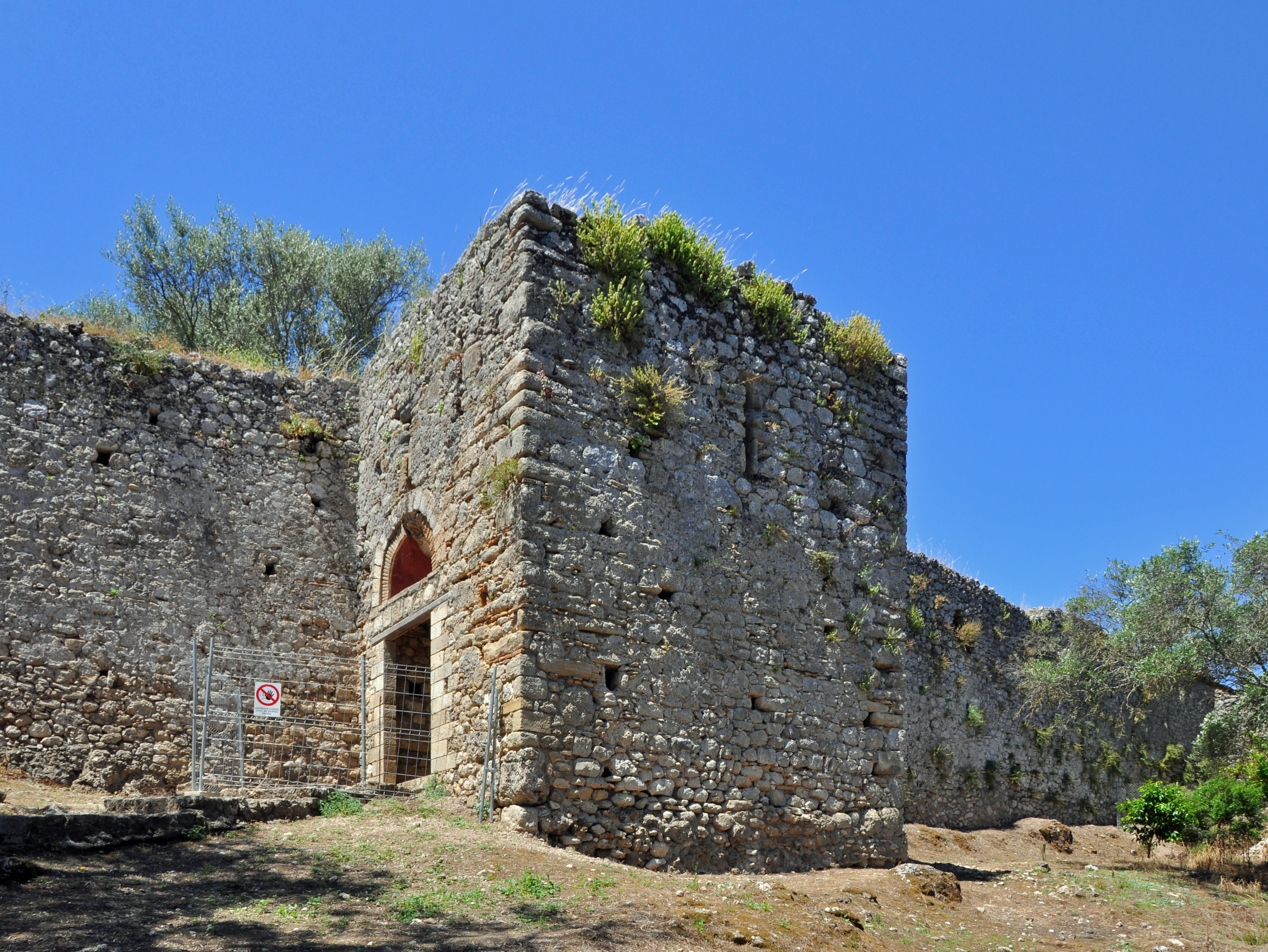
- Gardiki Castle

Site information
- Type: citadel
- Owner: Greece Greek Ministry of Culture
- Controlled by: Despotate of Epirus after 1214–59; Michael I 1205–1214/15; Michael II 1230–1259; Kingdom of Sicily 1259–66; Manfred 1259–66; Kingdom of Sicily 1266–1386; Republic of Venice 1386–1797; Corcyre 1797–1800; Septinsular Republic 1800–1807; First French Empire 1807–14; United States of the Ionian Islands 1815–64; Greece c. 1864
- Open to the public: Yes
- Condition: Preserved

Location
- Coordinates: 39.4768106°N 19.8855583°E

Site history
- Built by: Byzantine Empire
- Materials: hewn stone (ashlar)

Gardiki Castle (Greek: Κάστρο Γαρδικίου) is a 13th-century Byzantine castle on the southwestern coast of Corfu. It is the only surviving medieval fortress on the southern part of the island. It was built by a ruler of the Despotate of Epirus, and was one of three castles which defended the island before the Venetian era (1401–1797). The three castles formed a defensive triangle, with Gardiki guarding the island's south, Kassiopi Castle the northeast and Angelokastro the northwest

== Origins and location ==
The castle dates from the thirteenth century. It is located on a low hill near the village of Agios Matthaios, which is situated at a higher elevation. The ruler responsible for the construction of the castle is not known, but it is assumed that it was built either by Michael I Komnenos or his son Michael II Komnenos, rulers of the Despotate of Epirus. Immediately to the south of the castle lies Korissia Lake which is separated from the sea by a narrow strip of land.

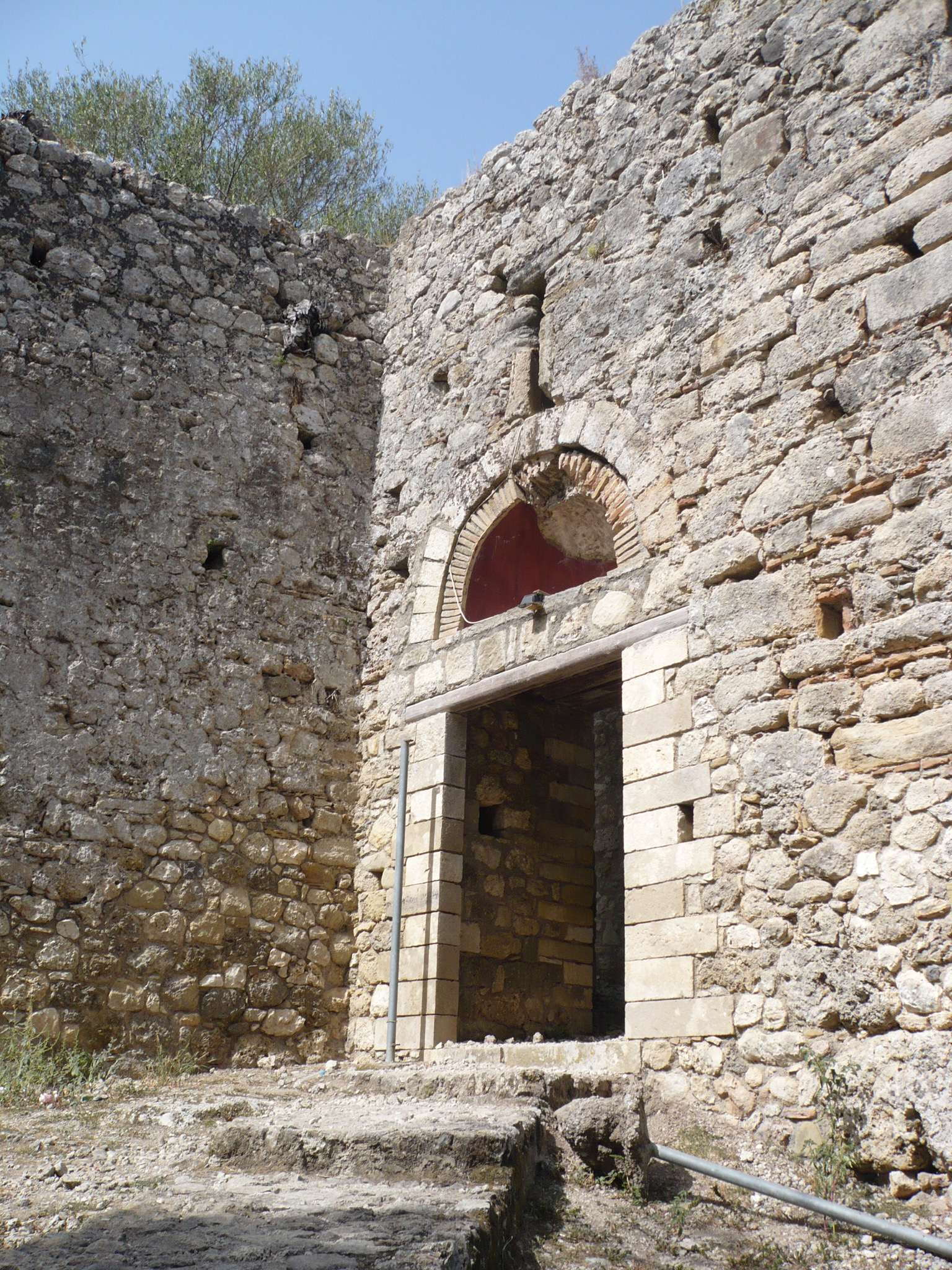
The entrance to the castle

Remains from the Upper Paleolithic era, dating from 20,000 B.C., when Corfu was still united to the mainland region of Epirus, were found on the site of the castle at the rock shelter of Grava Gardikiou, including hunter-gatherer stone tools and animal bones, which have since been removed and are exhibited at the Archaeological Museum of Corfu.

The location of Gardiki at the narrow southwest flank of Corfu provided protection to the fields and the southern lowlands of Corfu and in combination with Kassiopi Castle on the northeastern coast of the island and Byzantine Angelokastro protecting the northwestern shore of Corfu, formed a triangular line of defence which protected Corfu during the pre-Venetian era.

== Architecture ==
The walls of Gardiki Castle form an octagon and the structure features eight strong towers decorated by rows of tiles. There are elements from an ancient structure which have been incorporated into the construction of the castle. The ancient structure was probably a fountain-house.

The eight towers are square in shape and the outline of the octagonal structure is almost elliptical. At the top of the southern tower there are traces of a chapel with remnants of religious frescoes of portraits of saints. Although in a state of disrepair, the towers still retain their full height. The castle entrance is preserved but the interior is in a state of ruin.

Gardiki Castle is considered one of the most imposing architectural remains in the Ionian Islands, along with Angelokastro, Kassiopi Castle and the two Venetian Fortresses of Corfu City, the Citadel and the New Fort.

== Historical reference ==
Corfiote noble Andrea Marmora, the earliest historian of Corfu in medieval times, in his 1672 book Della Historia di Corfù mentions that the despots of Epirus adorned the city of Corfu with "most noble buildings" and built defences in other places on the island, including the fortresses of Gardiki and Angelokastro amongst other important sites.

== Architectural highlights ==
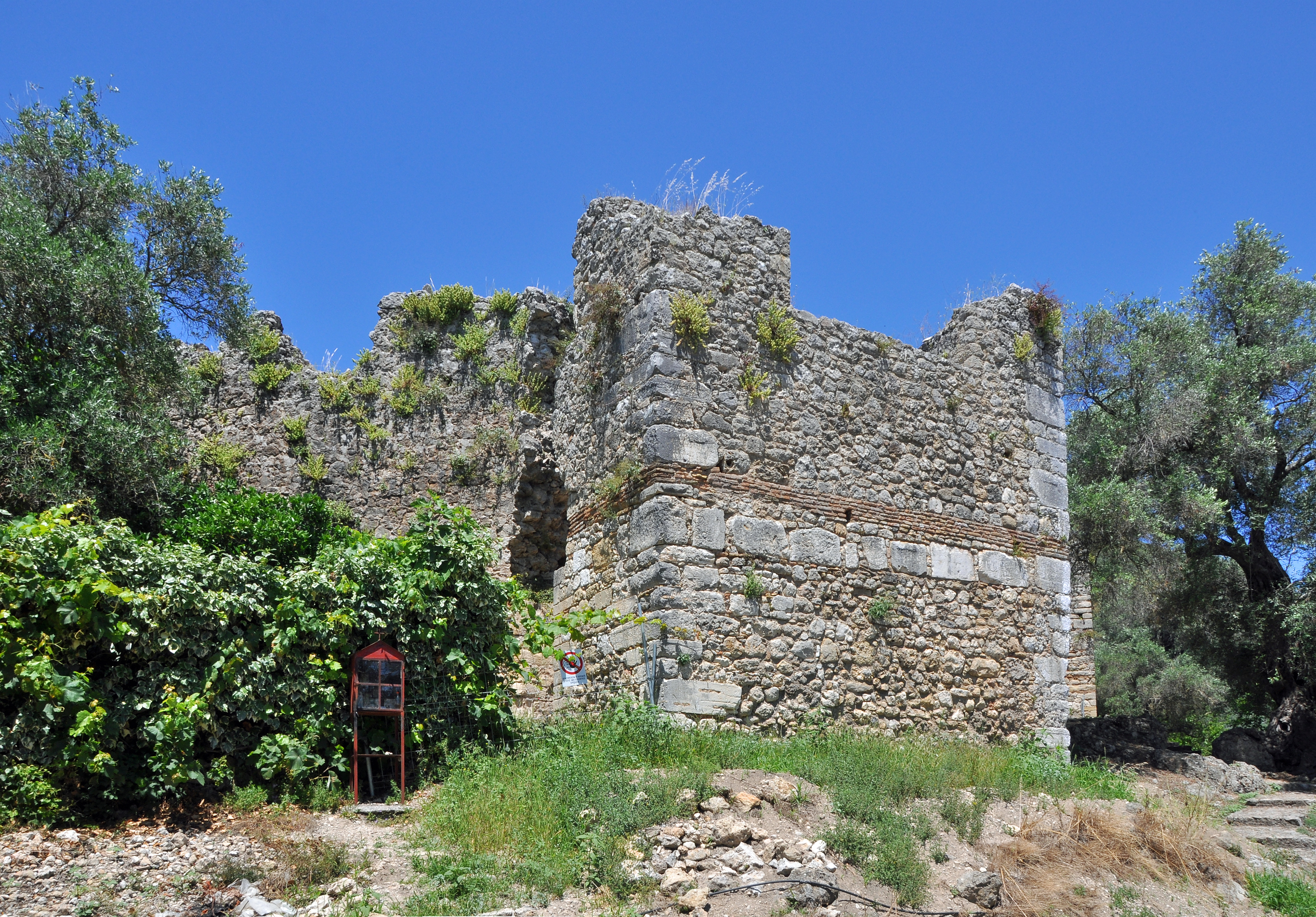
Detail of one of the towers of the castle

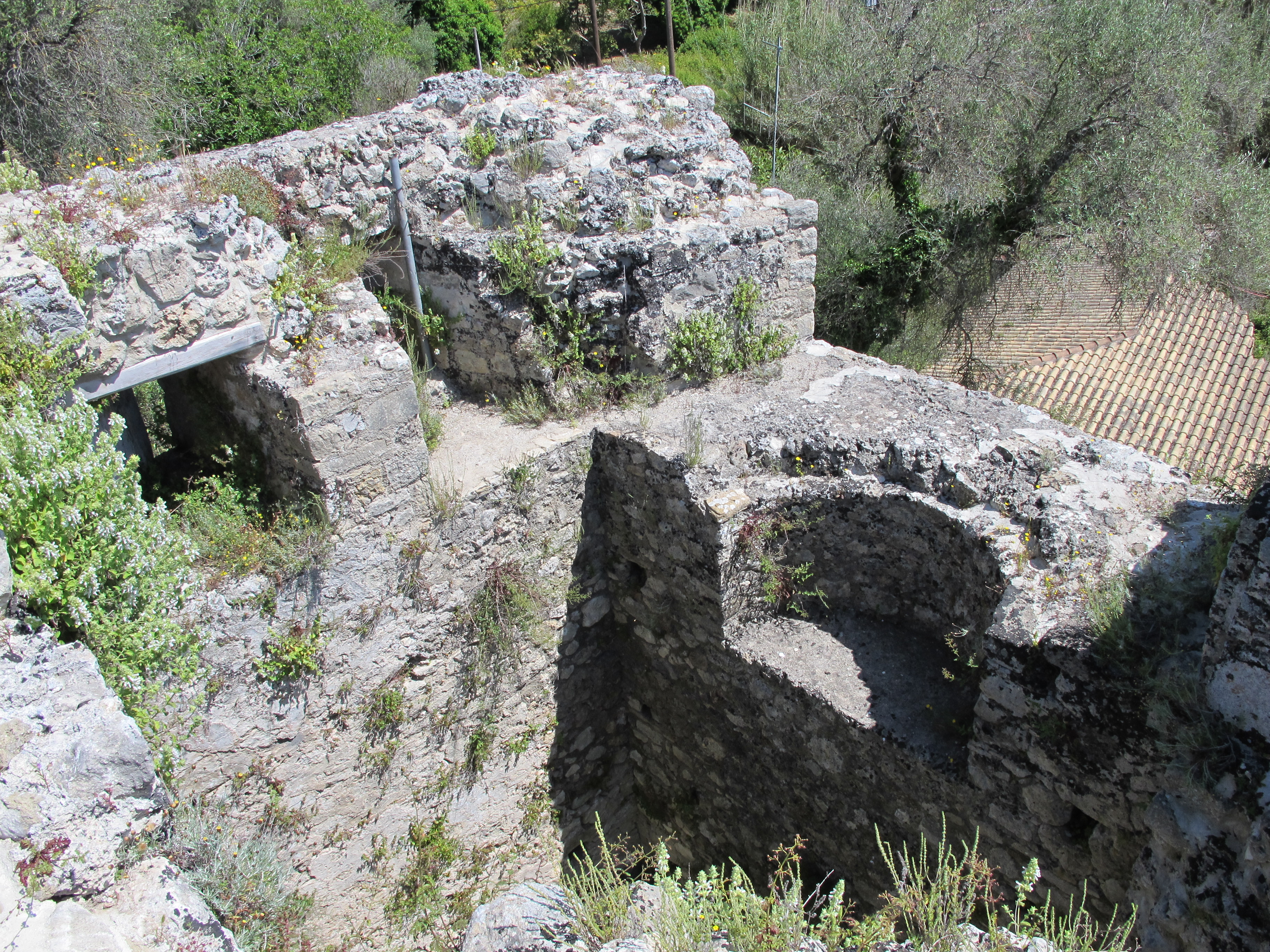
Detail of the walls

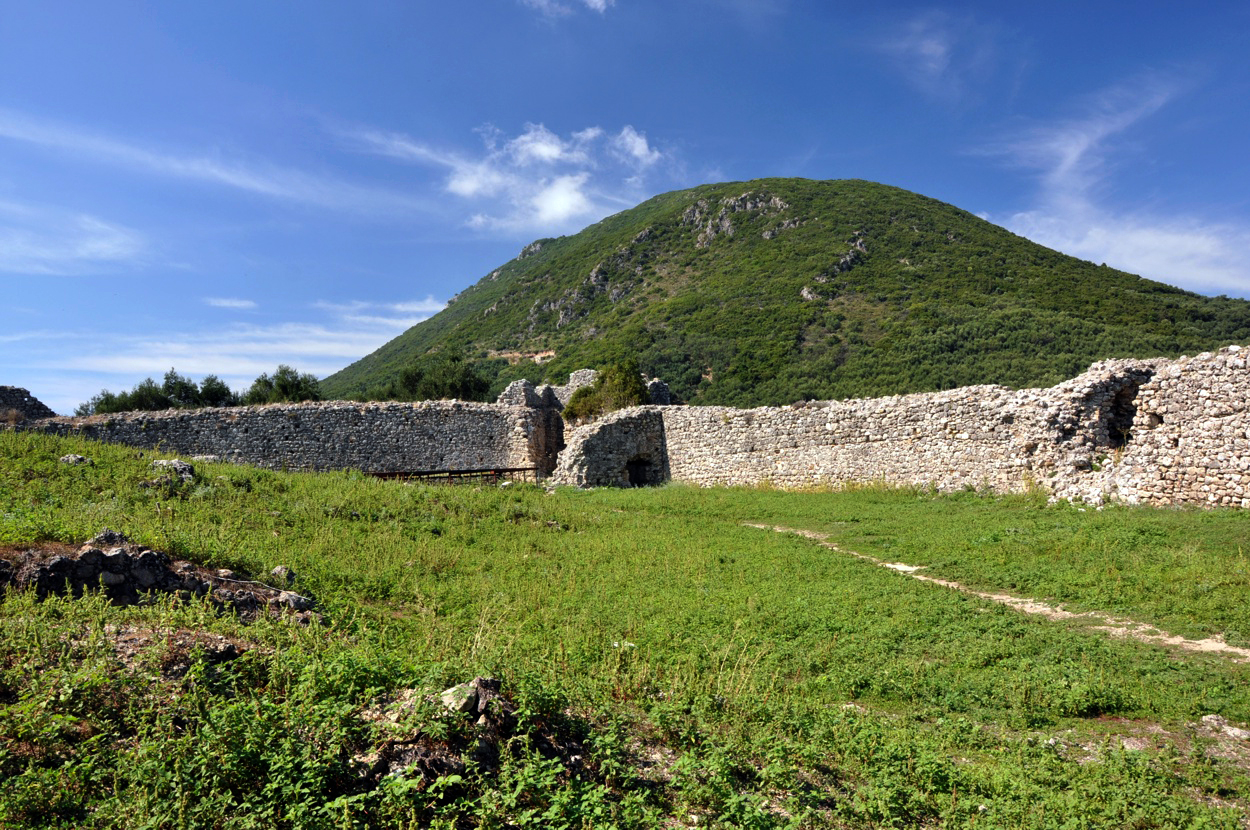
Outer perimeter of Gardiki Castle

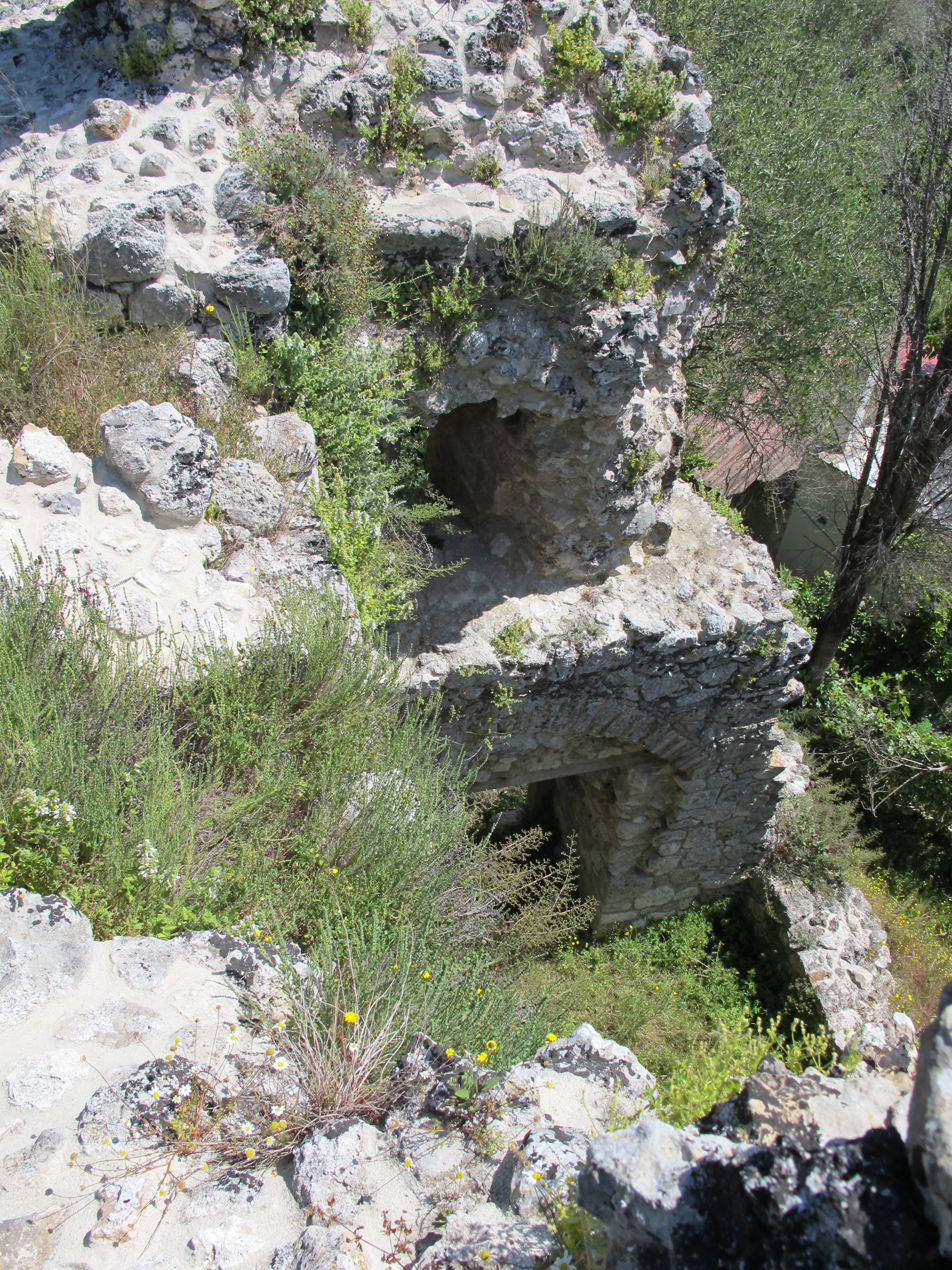
Detail of the walls
