= Kassiopi =

Kassiopi Κασσιόπη
- Community
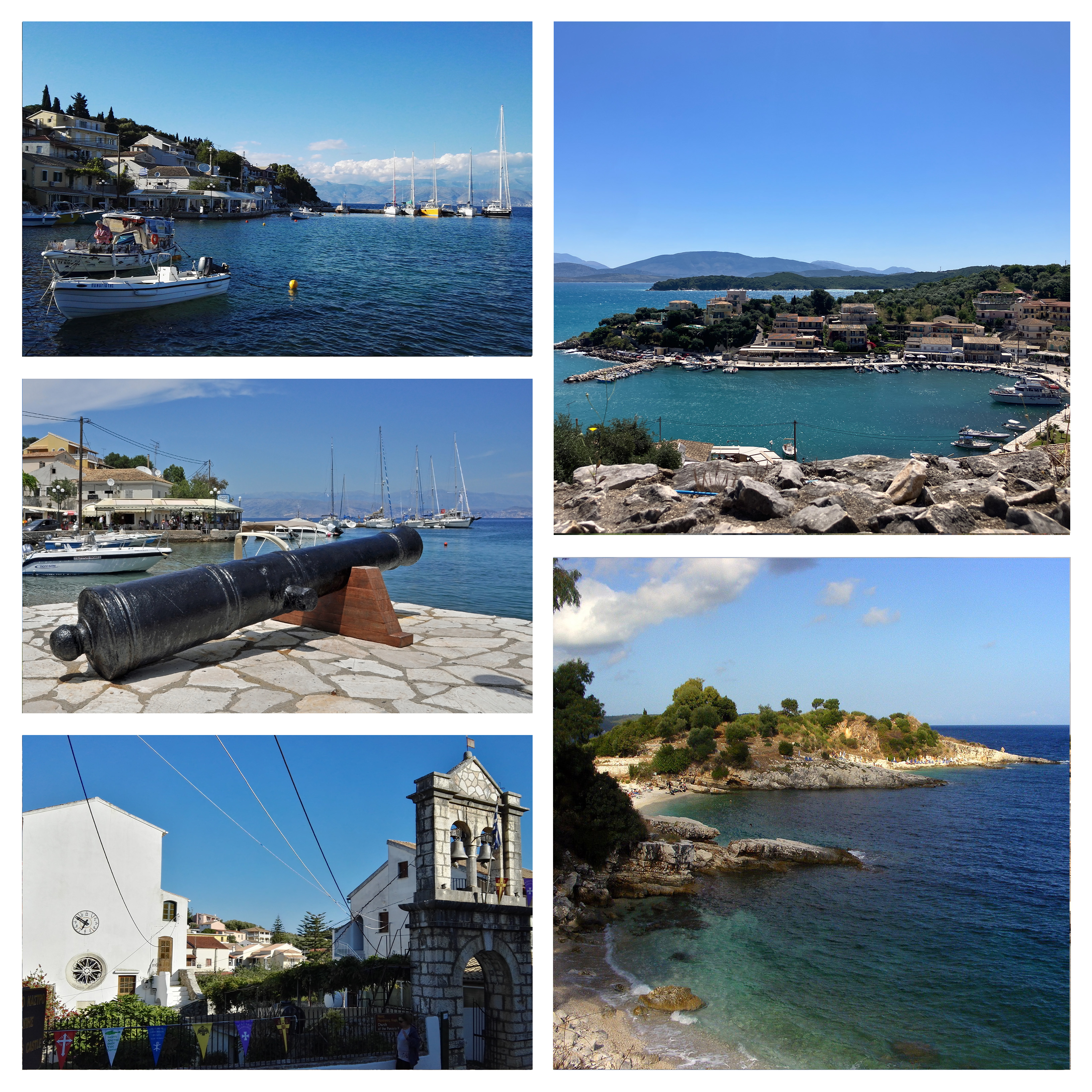
- Clockwise from the top left: Limani (Harbour); View from Kassiopi Castle; Bataria and Kanoni; Church of Panagia Kassopitra; Canon at the harbour

- Location within Greece
- Coordinates: 39°47′N 19°55′E
- Country: Greece
- Administrative region: Ionian Islands
- Regional unit: Corfu
- Municipality: North Corfu
- Municipal unit: Kassopaia

Population (2021)
  - Community: 1,147
- Time zone: UTC+2 (EET)
  - Summer (DST): UTC+3 (EEST)
- Vehicle registration: ΚΥ

Kassiopi or Cassiopi (Greek: Κασσιόπη) is a fishing village and vibrant holiday-making destination of Ancient Greek origin. It is situated on the affluent northeast coast of Corfu, Greece. Historically significant due to its strategic position overlooking the Corfu Channel, Kassiopi was fortified up until the destruction of its defences by the Republic of Venice. The remains of Kassiopi Castle still stand tall above the village and are of considerable archaeological importance. Its surroundings have largely been developed with luxury villas.

== Toponomy ==
Speculation surrounds the etymological roots of Kassiopi. The name may derive from the Temple of Cassius Zeus that the town was celebrated for in antiquity. The Cassius in Cassius Zeus has its origins in Mount Casius. Another etymological link may be Cassiopeia, the Queen punished by Poseidon for her vanity and who the constellation is also named after.

Due to the similarity in names there has been confusion between the Kassiopi of Corcyra (now Corfu) and Cassope of Epirus (now mainland Greece). One of the earliest literary records of Kassiopi was written by Cicero who uses the name Cassiope and describes a brief stay seeking shelter in the harbour. Variations in spelling include Kassiope, Kassope and Kassopi, with a K as well as with a C. Other names that were used by the Venetians include Casopo and Casopoli.

== History ==
Kassiopi's origins are unclear but given its strategic position it is not unreasonable to consider it likely to have been inhabited long before the Corinthian colonisation of Corcyra. Described by Sir William Smith as the only other city on the island in antiquity after Corcyra, Ptolemy also describes Kassiopi as a city, indicating its significance during Roman occupation. According to Suetonius, Emperor Nero sang at the altar of the temple.

The fortifications of Kassiopi Castle are mainly Byzantine however indication of the walls dating further back have been noted. The walls were fortified further by the Venetians, and survived sieges from the Ottoman Turks in the 16th century. Today the ruins still stand above the village echoing the rich history of the town.

Sometime in the 5th century the temple of Cassius Zeus was converted into a Christian church to honour the Holy Mother – Panayia Kassopitra. In 1537 the church was burned to the ground by the Turks, it was restored between 1590 and 1591. The new church had two altars to accommodate both Catholic and Orthodox religions and inscriptions on the church bear the dates 1590, 1670, and 1832.

== Tourism ==
Motor boats, which can be driven during the daytime only, are available for hire by the day or week. Excursions run daily from the harbour to all parts of the island. The central road runs beside the village square which is where buses stop, some 229 m (250 yd) from the harbour. In an attempt to alleviate the traffic density that occurred around the harbour, a car and coach park is provided at the top of the village. One or two taxis (which run 24 hours a day all over the island) are based here. Both the village and its surrounding areas are safe at all times of the day, with crime rates having remained consistently low for the whole northeast coast.

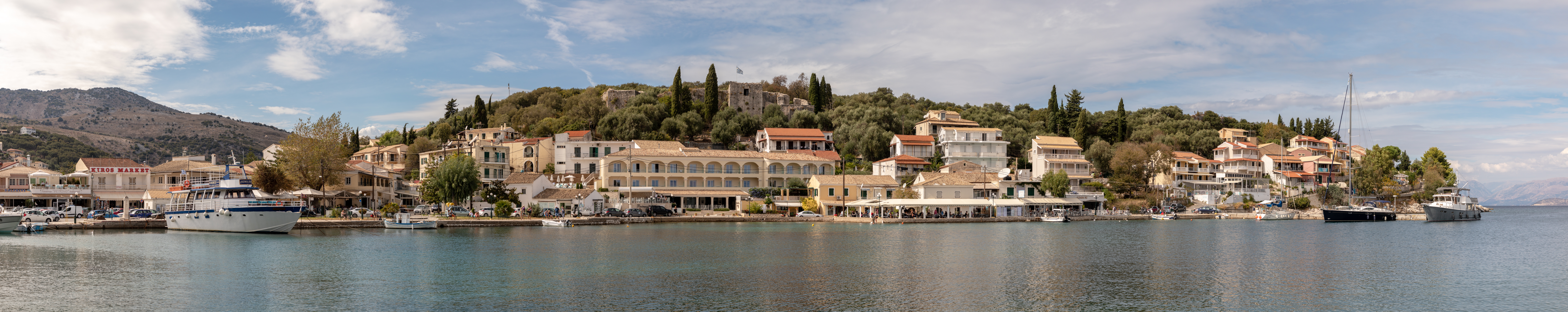
Panorama of Kassiopi

== Demographics ==
Year	Village population	Community population
1981	720	-
1991	872	-
2001	1,076	1,170
2011	812	977
2021	988	1,147

== See also ==
- Ancient Greece
- Corcyra
- Corfu
- Kassiopi Castle
- Republic of Venice
