= Mingori =

Mingori is a surname of Italian origin. Notable people with the surname include:

- D. Lewis Mingori (born 1938), American scientist
- Steve Mingori (1944–2008), American baseball player

== See also ==
- Mingori Robinetterie, French manufacturer of plumbing fixtures
