= Peretz P. Friedmann =

American aerospace engineer

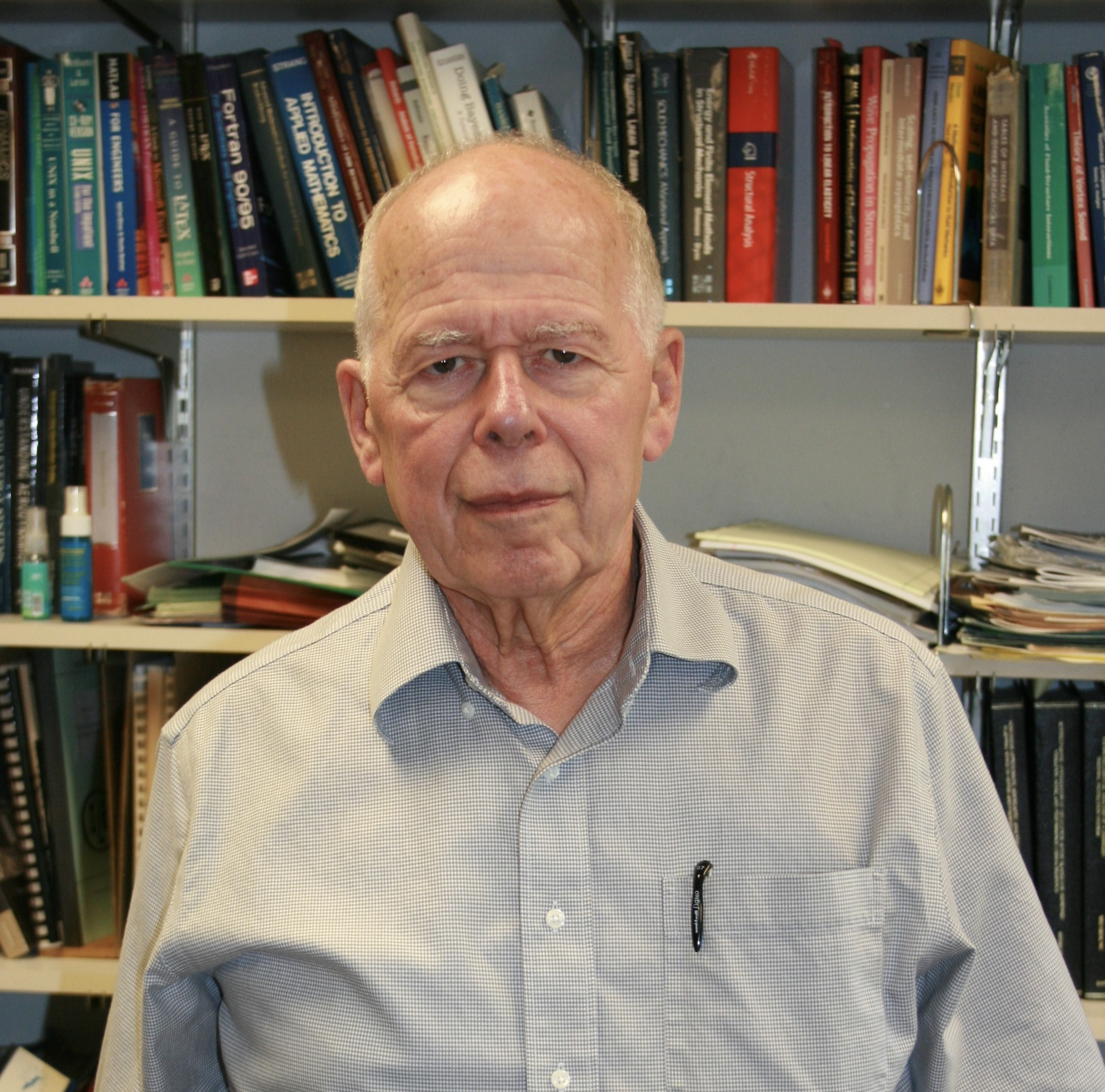
- Citizenship: American

Academic background
- Education: B.Sc., Aeronautical Engineering, Technion; M.Sc., Aeronautical Engineering, Technion; D.Sc., Aeronautics and Astronautics, M.I.T.
- Alma mater: Technion Israel Institute of Technology; Massachusetts Institute of Technology

Academic work
- Institutions: University of California, Los Angeles; University of Michigan, Ann Arbor

Peretz P. Friedmann is an American aerospace engineer and academic. He is the François-Xavier Bagnoud Professor Emeritus of Aerospace Engineering at the University of Michigan, Ann Arbor.

Friedmann is most known for his contributions to rotary and fixed-wing computational aeroelasticity, reducing helicopter vibration and noise through active flap control, aerothermoelasticity in hypersonic vehicles, multidisciplinary optimization, and aeroelasticity in turbomachinery. His works have been published in academic journals, including International Journal of Numerical Methods in Engineering, Journal of Guidance, Control, and Dynamics, AIAA Journal, and Journal of the American Helicopter Society. He is the recipient of the 2022 Reed Aeronautics Award from the American Institute of Aeronautics and Astronautics.

== Education and career ==
Friedmann received his B.Sc. and M.Sc. degrees in aeronautical engineering from the Technion Israel Institute of Technology, Haifa and his D.Sc. in aeronautics and astronautics from Massachusetts Institute of Technology in 1972. Between 1972 and 1998 he was an assistant professor, associate professor, and professor in the Mechanical and Aerospace Engineering Department of the University of California, Los Angeles. Between 1988 and 1991, he also served as the department chair. He was the editor-in-chief of Vertica – The International Journal of Rotorcraft and Powered Lift Aircraft from 1980 to 1990 and AIAA Journal from 2009 to 2014. In 1999, he joined the University of Michigan as the François-Xavier Bagnoud endowed chair in Aerospace Engineering and the director of the François Xavier Bagnoud Center for Fixed and Rotary Wing Air Vehicle Design. Since January 2024, he has held the position of François-Xavier Bagnoud Professor Emeritus there.

== Research ==
Friedmann has published over 390 journal and conference papers and a graduate level textbook titled Structural Dynamics Theory and Applications to Aerospace and Mechanical Engineering. He has mentored 41 Ph.D. students. Through his foundational research, he has advanced rotary and fixed-wing aeroelasticity and structural dynamics, on-blade control for reducing noise and vibration in rotorcraft, and the optimal design of helicopter rotors to minimize vibration. His work spans unsteady aerodynamics and rotorcraft aeromechanics, as well as hypersonic aeroelasticity, aerothermoelasticity, and the aeroelasticity of jet engine fan blades. A core focus of his research has been the reduction of vibrations in both military and civilian rotorcraft to enhance pilot performance, passenger comfort, and structural longevity. He was the first to demonstrate the feasibility of reducing helicopter rotor vibration using an "on-blade control" approach in 1991, with partial-span actively controlled trailing-edge flaps. In this method, the control surfaces and actuators are placed directly on the rotating blade. Over his 28-year research career, he advanced on-blade control to address both vibration and noise reduction, refining it into a practical tool for full-scale rotors.

== Awards and honors ==
- 1991 – Fellow, American Institute of Aeronautics and Astronautics
- 1984, 2004, 2010 – Structures and Materials Award, ASME/Boeing
- 1996 – Structures, Structural Dynamics, & Materials Award, AIAA
- 1997 – Structures, Structural Dynamics and Materials Lecture Award, AIAA
- 2003 – Spirit of St. Louis MedaL, ASME
- 2004 – Fellow Award, American Helicopter Society
- 2009 – Dryden Lectureship in Research, AIAA
- 2009 – Ashley Award for Aeroelasticity, Inaugural Recipient, AIAA
- 2013 – Alexander A. Nikolsky Honorary Lectureship, AHS
- 2016 – Meir Hanin International Aerospace Prize, Technion - Israel Institute of Technology
- 2017 – Dr. Alexander Klemin Award, AHS
- 2019 – Honorary Fellow Award, Vertical Flight Society (previously AHS)
- 2022 – Reed Aeronautics Award, AIAA
- 2023 – Fellow, American Society of Mechanical Engineers

== Bibliography ==
=== Book ===
- Structural Dynamics Theory and Applications to Aerospace and Mechanical Engineering (2023) ISBN 9781108842488

=== Selected articles ===
- Friedmann, P., Hammond, C. E., & Woo, T. H. (1977). Efficient numerical treatment of periodic systems with application to stability problems. International Journal for Numerical Methods in Engineering, 11(7), 1117–1136.
- Bendiksen, O., & Friedmann, P. (1980). Coupled bending-torsion flutter in cascades. AIAA Journal, 18(2), 194–201.
- Friedmann, P. P., & Shanthakumaran, P. (1984). Optimum design of rotor blades for vibration reduction in forward flight. Journal of the American Helicopter Society, 29(4), 70–80.
- Glaz, B., Liu, L., & Friedmann, P. P. (2010). Reduced-order nonlinear unsteady aerodynamic modeling using a surrogate-based recurrence framework. AIAA journal, 48(10), 2418–2429.
- McNamara, J. J., & Friedmann, P. P. (2011). Aeroelastic and aerothermoelastic analysis in hypersonic flow: past, present, and future. AIAA journal, 49(6), 1089–1122.
- Friedmann, P. P. (2014). On-blade control of rotor vibration, noise, and performance: Just around the corner? The 33rd Alexander Nikolsky honorary lecture. Journal of the American Helicopter Society, 59(4), 1-37.
- Huang, D., Friedmann, P. P., & Rokita, T. (2019). Aerothermoelastic scaling laws for hypersonic skin panel configurations with arbitrary flow orientation. AIAA journal, 57(10), 4377–4392.
