= Vangelis Petsalis =

Greek classical composer

Vangelis Petsalis (Greek: Βαγγέλης Πετσάλης) (born July 4, 1965) is a classical composer and pianist from Greece. He was born in Corfu and studied at the Conservatoire of the Philharmonic Society of Corfu. He studied orchestration and composition in Athens. His work includes compositions for orchestra, piano, choir and the theatre.

== Work ==
Vangelis Petsalis has composed violin concertos, and works for piano, mixed choir and orchestra. He has been a member of the Union of Greek Composers, since 1997. His symphonic classical music and music for theatre, has been performed by orchestras such as the National Greek Radio and Television Orchestra, Athens State National Orchestra, the Orchestra of the Colors and the Bulgarian Sofia Philharmonic Orchestra.

He has worked with a number of recording labels including ARCADIA, Agora musica, and LEGEND Classics. His works have been presented in Classical Discoveries, by Princeton University's radio station WPRB, during a segment called "A Visit with Greek composer, Vangelis Petsalis". He was appointed Art Director of the European Department of the Bulgarian Symphony Orchestra. In 2009 he was awarded a grant in the field of Music by the J.F. Costopoulos Foundation for "the recording of new symphonic works together with unpublished older works".

Petsalis's works were also performed during the inaugural events organised to mark the establishment of the centre of the Hellenic Foundation for Culture in Sofia. During the inaugural events of the HFC Centre, the Sofia Philharmonic Orchestra performed works by Vagellis Petsalis, Dimiter Christov, Carl Maria von Weber and Tchaikovsky.

On 30 March 2010 Petsalis gave a performance for the second consecutive year in Athens accompanied by the Musical Keys of the Municipality of Athens where he presented his own works as well as the works of other composers covering a musical spectrum from classical to jazz.

Petsalis has also studied medicine and is a specialist in radiology.
