= George A Danos =

Cypriot scientist, engineer, astronomer, and entrepreneur

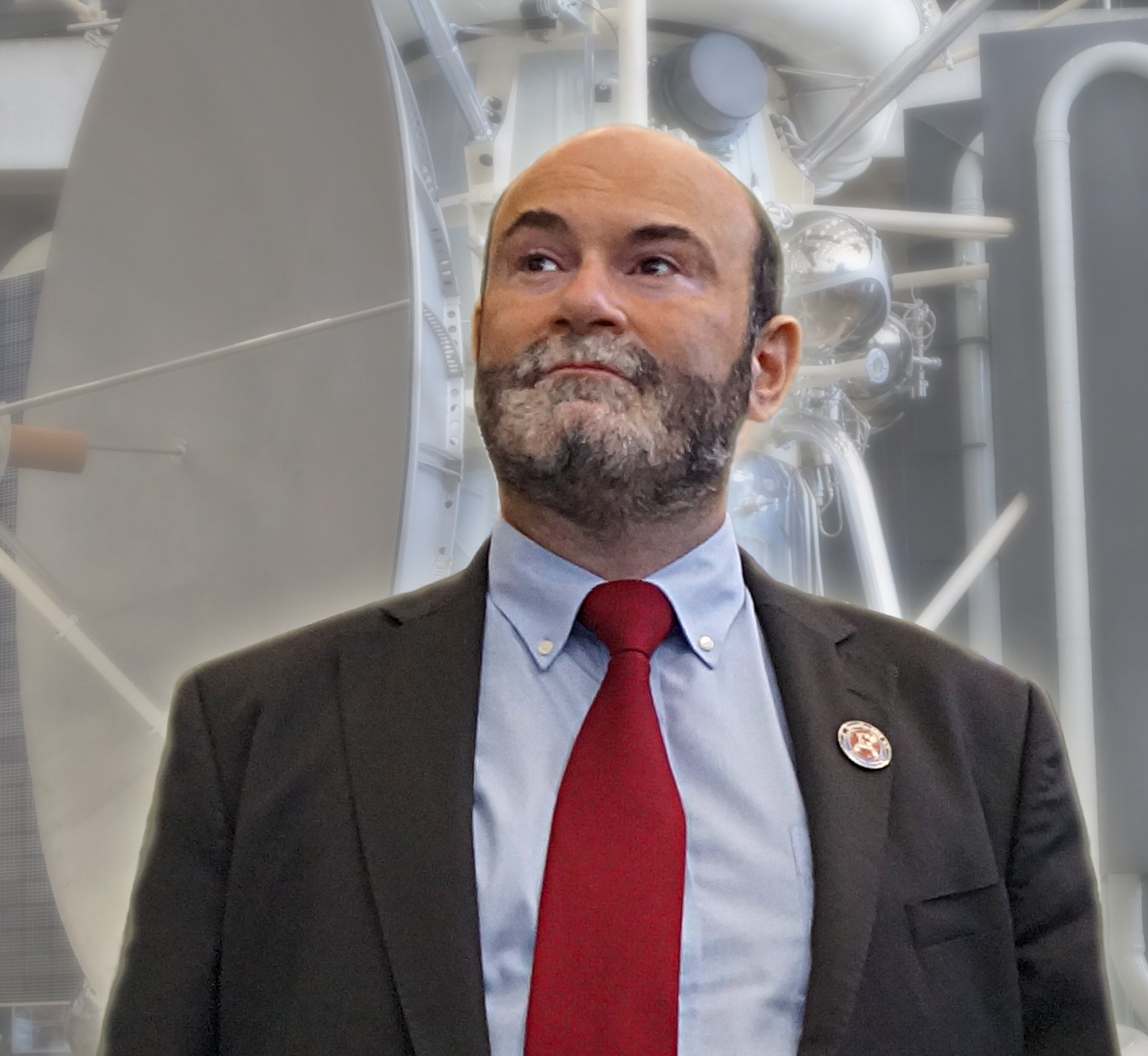
- Danos, standing in front of the earthbound twin of the Mars 3 spacecraft
- Born: Cyprus
- Occupations: President, Cyprus Space Exploration Organisation (CSEO); Director, International Space Innovation Centre (C-SpaRC)
- Organization: Cyprus Space Exploration Organisation
- Known for: Space Exploration, Innovation and Entrepreneurship

George A Danos (Greek: Γιώργος Α Δανός) is a Cypriot space scientist, space diplomat, engineer, astronomer, entrepreneur and science communicator. He is a graduate and recognised eminent alumnus of Imperial College London.

He is the President of the Cyprus Space Exploration Organisation (CSEO) and serves as the Director of the International Space Innovation Centre (C-SpaRC) - one of two global Centers of Excellence of the international Committee on Space Research (COSPAR).

He initiated and facilitated the Republic of Cyprus's accession to the NASA Artemis Accords, which marked the first formal agreement of the 2024 US-Cyprus Strategic Dialogue, and was appointed to serve as national representative to the agreement.

He served as the first elected President of the Parallel Parliament for Entrepreneurship of the Republic of Cyprus.

He is an Honorary Member of the International Astronomical Union (IAU), in recognition of his significant contributions to the progress of astronomy. He serves as Vice-chair of the Panel on Innovative Solutions (PoIS) of the international Committee on Space Research (COSPAR). He served as Communications Director of the Board of Directors of the European Association of Space Technology Research Organisations (EASTRO).

He has led several societies, groups, companies and organisations in the UK, Cyprus, Ireland, and in Europe and internationally.

== Early career ==
During his early career, whilst a student, he was elected for two terms as President of the Imperial College Students for the Exploration and Development of Space (IC-SEDS). He also served as a Board Member of UK-SEDS.

Whilst aged 27, he became Founder and Chief Technical Officer of Virgin Biznet, one of the most lucrative business ventures of Sir Richard Branson's Virgin Group, after pitching at the “House” of Richard Branson.

In 1996 he was part of the team that brought Virgin Radio's broadcast to the internet, making it the first European radio station to simulcast their live programme 24-hours a day on the internet.

== Space exploration career ==
=== Space exploration in Cyprus ===
In 2013 he was elected President of the Cyprus Space Exploration Organisation (CSEO), a position he continues to hold.

As President of CSEO, he led the national campaign that saw Cyprus join the European Space Agency, as a PECS Member.

He mentored and nurtured the local space community of Cyprus that saw notable achievements and multiple international awards won by many teams of CSEO, and brokered many international agreements with international synergies and space research projects.

He was responsible for the establishment of the Cyprus Space Centre and notably for Cyprus being selected as an International Astronomy Education Centre of the International Astronomical Union (IAU).

==== Infrastructure and Innovation - C-SpaRC ====
He is the architect and Director of the Cyprus Space Research and Innovation Centre (C-SpaRC), inaugurated in 2024. Under his leadership, C-SpaRC was designated as the world's first COSPAR International Space Innovation Centre and a COSPAR Centre of Excellence. He built a physical transnational research hub that unites strategic partners NASA and Lockheed Martin with institutions from Europe and the Middle East.

==== Apollo 17 Goodwill Moonrock ====
In 2022, CSEO partnered with the US Embassy to create and host the Space Exhibition: "From Apollo to Artemis", celebrating 50 years from Apollo 17 (Dec 1973) to Artemis 1 (Dec 2023). For the exhibition, the US Government returned the Apollo 17 'Goodwill' Moonrock which was on display to the Cypriot public, bringing together young people and children across the division line 'Under one sky'.

=== Involvement in international space exploration ===
He is a Council Member – the highest governing body – of the international Committee on Space Research (COSPAR). In October 2020, he was appointed as Vice-chair of COSPAR's Panel on Innovative Solutions (PoIS) (see below for details in this role).

He is representing the Republic of Cyprus to the Global Experts Group on Sustainable Lunar Activities (GEGSLA).

He is the official representative of Cyprus to COSPAR and as President of CSEO – the National Member to the International Astronomical Union (IAU) – he is also the official representative of Cyprus to the IAU. He is also the official representative of CSEO to the International Astronautical Federation (IAF).

He serves as Chair of the Analogue Working Group of the Moon Village Association (MVA) and as Middle East & Africa Regional Coordinator for the MVA.

During the 70th International Astronautical Congress held in Washington, D.C., as a panelist of the "Martian and Lunar Analogues" Global Networking Forum, he announced the International Moon Analogue Consortium.

==== Space Diplomacy and United Nations - MUAN, GEGSLA and IMD ====
In 2018, he brokered the "Nicosia Declaration" between NASA (USA), ESA (EU), and IKI (Russia), which established Nicosia as the neutral, permanent base for the Mars Upper Atmosphere Network (MUAN). This agreement ensured the uninterrupted exchange of critical scientific data between Western and Russian Mars orbiters during periods of geopolitical strain.

In 2020, the increasing number of lunar missions planned by various nations and private entities highlighted a critical lack of coordination mechanisms, posing risks of interference and a need for sustainable guidelines. To address this, he collaborated with the Moon Village Association (MVA) to promote the establishment of a neutral, multilateral diplomatic forum. He travelled to Vienna to engage directly with the United Nations Office for Outer Space Affairs (UNOOSA), formally inviting the agency to co-organise and participate in international space dialogues. Working alongside the MVA, he advocated for the "Moon Village Principles" - a set of best practices for sustainable lunar activities - and strategised to secure broad consensus among UN COPUOS member states. These diplomatic efforts culminated during the First Online Global Moon Village Workshop and Symposium in November 2020, which he hosted and chaired from Nicosia. At this event, the creation of the Global Experts Group on Sustainable Lunar Activities (GEGSLA) was officially announced. As a founding member of GEGSLA, he was appointed as the representative of the Republic of Cyprus to the group. Furthermore, to ensure GEGSLA's operational success and to facilitate its ongoing dialogue at the UN COPUOS level, he committed CSEO to serve as the inaugural administrative home base for the initiative.

In 2021, he played an instrumental role in the UN General Assembly's proclamation of the International Moon Day (IMD). As a Founding Member of the initiative, he helped mobilise diplomatic consensus at the UN COPUOS level, and chaired the inaugural global announcement from Nicosia.

==== NASA Artemis Accords and US-Cyprus Strategic Dialogue ====
He initiated and facilitated the diplomatic negotiations for the Republic of Cyprus to join the NASA Artemis Accords. Leveraging his foundational role in the Global Experts Group on Sustainable Lunar Activities (GEGSLA), he travelled to NASA Headquarters alongside the Chief Scientist of Cyprus and brokered the country's accession to the Artemis Accords. This effort culminated on 23 October 2024, when the Artemis Accords were signed as the first formal agreement of the inaugural US-Cyprus Strategic Dialogue. Following the signing at the Presidential Palace in Nicosia, by the U.S. Assistant Secretary of State and the Deputy Minister of Research, Innovation and Digital Policy (DMRID), Danos was appointed as a national representative to the agreement.

==== COSPAR 2025 - the 6th COSPAR Global Symposium ====
In November 2025, he hosted and chaired COSPAR 2025, the 6th COSPAR Global Symposium in Nicosia, themed "Space Exploration 2025: A Symposium on Humanity's Challenges and Celestial Solutions." The event gathered over 300 scientists and leaders of major space agencies. The symposium saw the official release of the COSPAR Heliophysics Guidelines - the Global Guidelines on "Space Weather" and Heliophysics - a set of unified global principles for the scientific study of the Sun and its effects.

==== EASTRO - Contribution to European Space Policy and Institutional Activities ====
He is Executive Board Member for Communication of the European Association of Space Technology Research Organisations (EASTRO), which represents Research and Technology Organisations (RTOs) with Space activities in Europe towards the ESA, the European Commission and other major Institutional and Industrial stakeholders in Europe and the World. Its member institutes have more than 65,000 employees, with a combined turnover of more than 7,000 M€, and contribute to all areas of space in Europe, from advanced structures, satellite sub-systems and instruments to quantum technologies and the utilisation of remote sensing data for climate change analysis with the objective to create innovations with impact on societal goals with economic impact.

==== COSPAR - Artificial Intelligence and Space Weather prediction ====
As vice-chair of the COSPAR Panel on Innovative Solutions (PoIS), he managed the creation of the Space Innovation Lab of COSPAR, bridging the science of space weather with the engineering tools of artificial intelligence, analysing space weather data and potentially predicting dangerous storms heading towards our planet and raising a warning alarm if needed.

During the 44th COSPAR General Assembly in July 2022, as Main Scientific Organiser (MSO) of the PoIS.2 panel session, he led the effort of bridging global industry and the scientific community towards the above goals.

These initiatives served as the direct precursor to the creation of the Cyprus Space Research and Innovation Centre (see C-SpaRC). To permanently operationalise the mandate of the COSPAR Space Innovation Lab, he established C-SpaRC in 2024 as a physical, transnational hub to scale these space weather predictive capabilities.

=== Science communicator ===
He is a science communicator and advocate of solar system and space exploration.

He gave many presentations worldwide, including a TEDx talk, and he is the presenter of the "2030: SpaceWorks" global webinars, with a viewership of over 80,000 people worldwide.

== Parallel Parliament of the Republic of Cyprus ==
From November 2019 to October 2020, he served as Dean and M.P. of the Parallel Parliament for Research, Innovation and Digital Governance of the Republic of Cyprus. In October 2020, he was subsequently elected as the first President of the Parallel Parliament for Entrepreneurship of the Republic of Cyprus for a four-year term.

== Recognitions and awards ==
=== Recognition: Academician of the International Academy of Astronautics (IAA) ===
In recognition of his contributions and achievements in promoting astronautics and space exploration he was elected Corresponding Member and Academician of the International Academy of Astronautics.

=== Recognition: Honorary Member of the International Astronomical Union (IAU) ===
The International Astronomical Union (IAU) selected him as Honorary Member of the IAU, in recognition to his significant contributions to the progress of astronomy, including leading campaigns that saw Cyprus join ESA, the IAU and COSPAR, as well as establishing the Cyprus Space Centre and helping Cyprus be selected as an International Astronomy Education Centre of the IAU Office for Astronomy Education (OAE).

=== Award: Ambassador of Hellenic Culture of the Hellenic Foundation for Culture (HFC) ===
The Hellenic Foundation for Culture of the Hellenic Republic awarded him as Ambassador of Hellenic Culture, in recognition to his international contribution to the advancement and promotion of space sciences, for his international successes, and for representing the Greek Spirit, Language and Culture.

== Notable positions ==
- Nov 2025 - Chair and Host, 6th COSPAR Global Symposium.
- Oct 2024 - Representative of Cyprus to the NASA Artemis Accords.
- Jun 2024 - Director, International Space Innovation Centre (C-SpaRC).
- Mar 2023 - Ambassador of Hellenic Culture, Hellenic Foundation for Culture, Hellenic Republic.
- Dec 2022 - Executive Board Member for Communication, European Association of Space Technology Research Organisations.
- Aug 2021 - Honorary Member of the International Astronomical Union (IAU).
- Feb 2021 - Representative of the Republic of Cyprus to the Global Experts Group on Sustainable Lunar Activities (GEGSLA).
- Oct 2020 - President of the Parallel Parliament for Entrepreneurship of the Republic of Cyprus.
- Oct 2020 - Vice-chair of the Panel on Innovative Solutions (PoIS) of the international Committee on Space Research (COSPAR).
- Nov 2019 - Dean of the Parallel Parliament for Research, Innovation and Digital Governance of the Republic of Cyprus.
- Sep 2019 - Middle East & Africa Regional Coordinator of the Moon Village Association (MVA).
- Oct 2018 - Chair, Mars Upper Atmosphere Network (MUAN) international agreement.
- Jun 2018 - Chair of the Analogue Working Group of the Moon Village Association (MVA).
- Mar 2018 - Corresponding Member and Academician of the International Academy of Astronautics (IAA).
- Dec 2016 - Council Member of the international Committee on Space Research (COSPAR).
- Oct 2013 - President of the Cyprus Space Exploration Organisation (CSEO).
- May 1999 - Founder and Chief Technical Officer of Virgin Biznet.
- Oct 1992 - Board Member of the United Kingdom Students for the Exploration and Development of Space (UK-SEDS).
- Oct 1991 - President of the Imperial College Students for the Exploration and Development of Space (IC-SEDS).
