= D. Lewis Mingori =

American engineer (1938–2026)

Diamond Lewis (Tino) Mingori (June 7, 1938 – November 13, 2026) was an American who was a longtime professor of Mechanical & Aerospace Engineering at the University of California at Los Angeles (UCLA). From his retirement in 2003 until his death, he served as a Professor Emeritus. His research and teaching focused on attitude dynamics and control, stability theory, nonlinear methods, applications to space and ground vehicles.

== Personal history ==
The grandson of Italian immigrants, Mingori grew up in Los Angeles where he became the first member of his family to attend college. Mingori recalled, “My parents did not complete high school, but they always encouraged me to study hard. My teachers at Louis Pasteur Jr. High (now the Los Angeles Center for Enriched Studies) and at Hamilton High provided the knowledge and guidance that brought a university education within reach. That education began in 1956 when I enrolled as a freshman in engineering at UCLA.”

== Career ==
He earned his B.S. degree from the University of California-Berkeley before receiving his M.S. in 1962 at the University of California-Los Angeles with the thesis entitled "Gravity torque on a spinning satellite body". He earned his Ph.D. from Stanford University in 1966 with his dissertation on "Attitude Stabilization of Satellites by Means of Gyroscopic Devices". He also served in editorial roles of many trade publications such as AIAA Journal of Guidance, Control, and Dynamics as well as Journal of Spacecraft and Rockets. And in 1999, Mingori was elected a fellow of the American Institute of Aeronautics and Astronautics professional society.

== Publications ==
- D.L. Mingori, Effects of Energy Dissipation on the Attitude Stability of Dual-Spin Satellites, AIAA Journal, Volume 7 No. 1, 20-27, 1969.
- Peter W. Likins, Gan-Tai Tseng and D. Lewis Mingori, Stable Limit Cycles due to Nonlinear Damping in Dual Spin Spacecraft, AIAA Journal of Spacecraft, Volume 8 No. 6, 568-574, 1971.
- John B. Moore and D.L. Mingori, Robust frequency-shaped LQ control, Automatica (Journal of IFAC), Volume 23, Issue 5 (September 1987) Pages: 641 - 646, 1987. ISSN 0005-1098
- P.A. Blelloch and D.L. Mingori, Robust Linear Quadratic Gaussian Control for Flexible Structures, AIAA Journal of Guidance, Control, and Dynamics, Volume 13 No. 1, 66-72, 1990.
- George A. Lesieutre and D. Lewis Mingori, Finite Element Modeling of Frequency-Dependent Material Damping Using Augmenting Thermodynamic Fields, AIAA Journal of Guidance, Control, and Dynamics, Volume 13 No. 6, 1990.
- J.T. Spanos and D.L. Mingori, Newton Algorithm for Fitting Transfer Functions to Frequency Response Measures, AIAA Journal of Guidance, Control, and Dynamics, Volume 16 No. 1, 34-39, 1993.
- Levent Turan and D.L. Mingori, A unified loop transfer recovery approach to robust control using H∞ optimization methods, Automatica (Journal of IFAC), Volume 31 Issue 7 Publisher: Pergamon Press, Inc. July 1995.
- D.M. Halsmer and D.L. Mingori, Nutational Stability and Passive Control of Spinning Rockets with Internal Mass Motion, AIAA Journal of Guidance, Control, and Dynamics, Volume 18 No. 5, September–October 1995.
- R.J. Kinsey, D.L. Mingori and R.H. Rand, Nonlinear Control of Dual Spin Spacecraft During Despin Through Precession Phase Lock, AIAA Journal of Guidance, Control, and Dynamics 19(1), 60–67, January–February 1996.
- K.F. Zimmerman and D.L. Mingori, Identification of state space models using least squares or instrumental variables, AIAA-1996-3715 Guidance, Navigation and Control Conference, San Diego, CA, July 29–31, 1996.
- M.L. Baker and D.L. Mingori, Removing Bias from Discrete Time Models Based on Finite Interval Response Data, AIAA Journal of Guidance, Control, and Dynamics 19(6), 1216–1220, November–December 1996.
- Y. Yam, D.L. Mingori and D.M. Halsmer,Stability of a Spinning Axisymetric Satellite With Dissipative Internal Mass Motion, AIAA Journal of Guidance, Control, and Dynamics 20(2), 306–313, March–April 1997.
- Randal K. Douglas, Walter H. Chung, Durga P. Malladi, Robert H. Chen, Jason L. Speyer, and D. Lewis Mingori, Integration Of Fault Detection And Identification Into A Fault Tolerant Automated Highway System, California Partners for Advanced Transit and Highways (PATH). Research Reports: Paper UCB-ITS-PRR-97-52. January 1997.
- Peter A. Monkewitz and D.L. Mingori, Adaptive and Nonadaptive Feedback Control of Global Instabilities with Application to a Heated 2-D Jet, Defense Technical Information Center OAI-PMH Repository (United States). 1998.
