= Cyprus Space Exploration Organisation =

Nonprofit organization

- Κυπριακός Οργανισμός Εξερεύνησης Διαστήματος

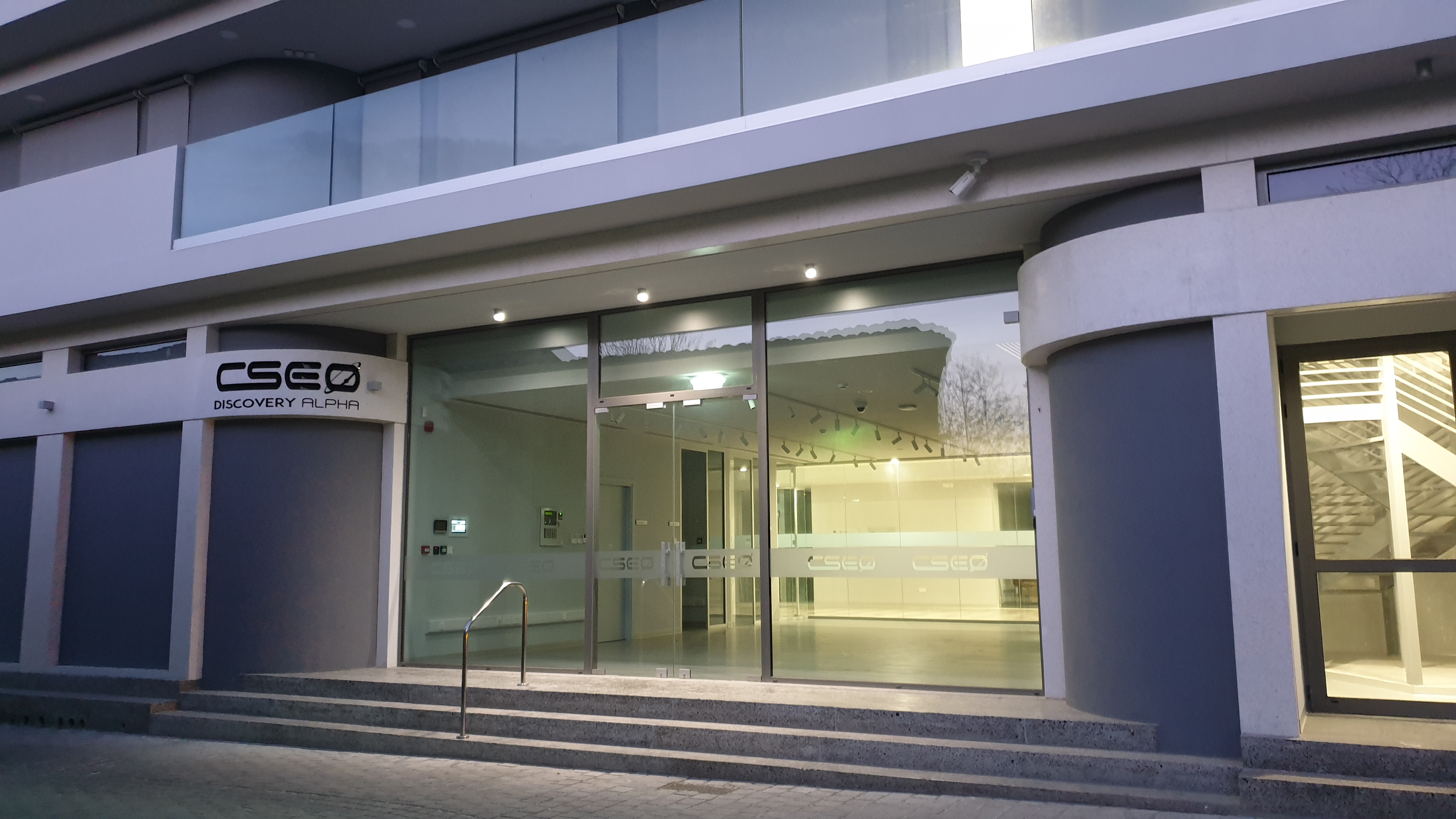
- CSEO Space Research Center
- Abbreviation: CSEO
- Formation: November 2012; 14 years ago
- Type: Non-governmental
- Legal status: Non-profit
- Purpose: Fosters International Collaboration. Promotes Space Exploration - R&D, Education and Industry.
- Location: Cyprus
- Region served: Global
- Fields: Space Exploration
- Members: 1800+ members internationally, 400,000+ social media followers
- Leader: George A Danos
- Website: https://www.space.org.cy

The Cyprus Space Exploration Organisation (CSEO) is a non-governmental, nonprofit, science organisation, based in Cyprus, with a global scope of service and activities. Its main functions are research and development, space advocacy, and international cooperation in the field of space exploration, astronautics and astronomy. Education and outreach are also an important part of its mission as International Astronomy Education Center (see below).

The organisation promotes and facilitates internationally scientific collaboration in space exploration, and fosters domestically collaboration with other space-faring nations in science, space and planetary missions. It was founded in 2012 and has over 1800 registered researchers, members and volunteers and over 400,000 followers on social media.

CSEO is the international host of:

- The International Astronomy Education Center, OAE Cyprus, of the IAU (see below),
- The Mars Upper Atmosphere Network (MUAN), as international host (see below),
- The Space Innovation Laboratory, under the auspices of the International Committee on Space Research (COSPAR),
- The Moon Village Association (MVA) Management Support Office, as part of the institutional partnership between CSEO and MVA.

CSEO is the official representative of Cyprus to:

- The Committee on Space Research (COSPAR), as Cyprus’ “National Institute” to COSPAR,
- The International Astronomical Union (IAU), as Cyprus’ “National Member” to the IAU,
- The Global Experts Group on Sustainable Lunar Activities (GEGSLA), as representative of the Republic of Cyprus,
- The Moon Village Association, as institutional member and regional coordinator for Middle East, Africa and Greece,
- The Mars Society, having established the national chapter – Mars Society Cyprus,
- ActInSpace and DefInSpace as Country Lead,
- Mission X, as Country Lead.

CSEO is member / partner of:

- The International Astronautical Federation (IAF),
- Copernicus Academy Network of EU Commission, as a founding member, (See copernicus.eu)
- The Canadian Aeronautics and Space Institute (CASI),
- The Italian Mars Society.

CSEO's board and council are comprised with distinguished individuals that are highly decorated for their contribution to space exploration.

== Notable achievements and awards ==
Since 2013 multiple teams of CSEO have won internationally at NASA and other international competitions (for more details see Promoting Space Innovation and NASA Space Apps Challenge in Cyprus). Notably:

- ArachnoBeeA was selected by NASA judges as the global winner of the 2015 NASA International Space Apps Challenge for the “Best Mission Concept” (May 2015).
- Brute Force was selected by NASA judges as a global winner of the 2022 NASA International Space Apps Challenge for “Local Impact” (Dec 2022).
- MarsSense has been recognized for its research paper and was nominated in the best four in the world for an international award, at SpaceOps 2014 (at JPL, NASA in May 2014).
- NestFold was voted and chosen by the people at the 2017 NASA International Space Apps Challenge for "Global Peoples' Choice" (Jul 2017).
- Hiris Guider was selected by the jury panel (representing the European Commission, the European Union Agency for the Space Programme (EUSPA) and other related industries) as 1st Winner at the 5th CASSINI Hackathon (Apr 2023).
- Galactic Angels was selected by the judges of the Commandement de l'Espace as winners of the second prize at the DefInSpace 2022 competition (Jul 2022).

The Chief of International Relations of CSEO has been awarded the Distinguished Service Award 2017 of the International Astronautical Federation, for extraordinary dedication and commitment, in service of the Federation (March 2017).

The President and vice-president of CSEO have been elected corresponding members to the International Academy of Astronautics, for outstanding contribution to space exploration (July 2017).

The Head of Education and Outreach of CSEO has been elected corresponding member to the International Academy of Astronautics, for outstanding contribution to space exploration (Oct 2019).

The President of CSEO has been appointed as vice-chair of the COSPAR Panel on Innovative Solutions (PoIS) (Oct 2020).

The President of CSEO has been selected by the International Astronomical Union (IAU) to be honored with the title of “Honorary Member” of the IAU, for his significant contribution to the progress of astronomical research in his country (Aug 2021).

The President and the Head of Innovation of CSEO have been recognized by the Hellenic Foundation for Culture, of the Hellenic Republic, as Ambassadors of Hellenic Culture for the contribution to space exploration and innovation (May 2023).

The Chief Innovation Officer of CSEO, who has been organising since 2013 the NASA Space Apps Challenge (Cyprus), ActInSpace (Cyprus), DefInSpace (Cyprus) and the International Moon Village Association Hackathon (globally), that mentored and facilitated multiple global wins at NASA and EU, has been awarded by NASA at a ceremony at NASA HQ for "outstanding leadership in empowering the next generation to address challenges we face on Earth and in space" (June 2024).

== Mission and goals ==
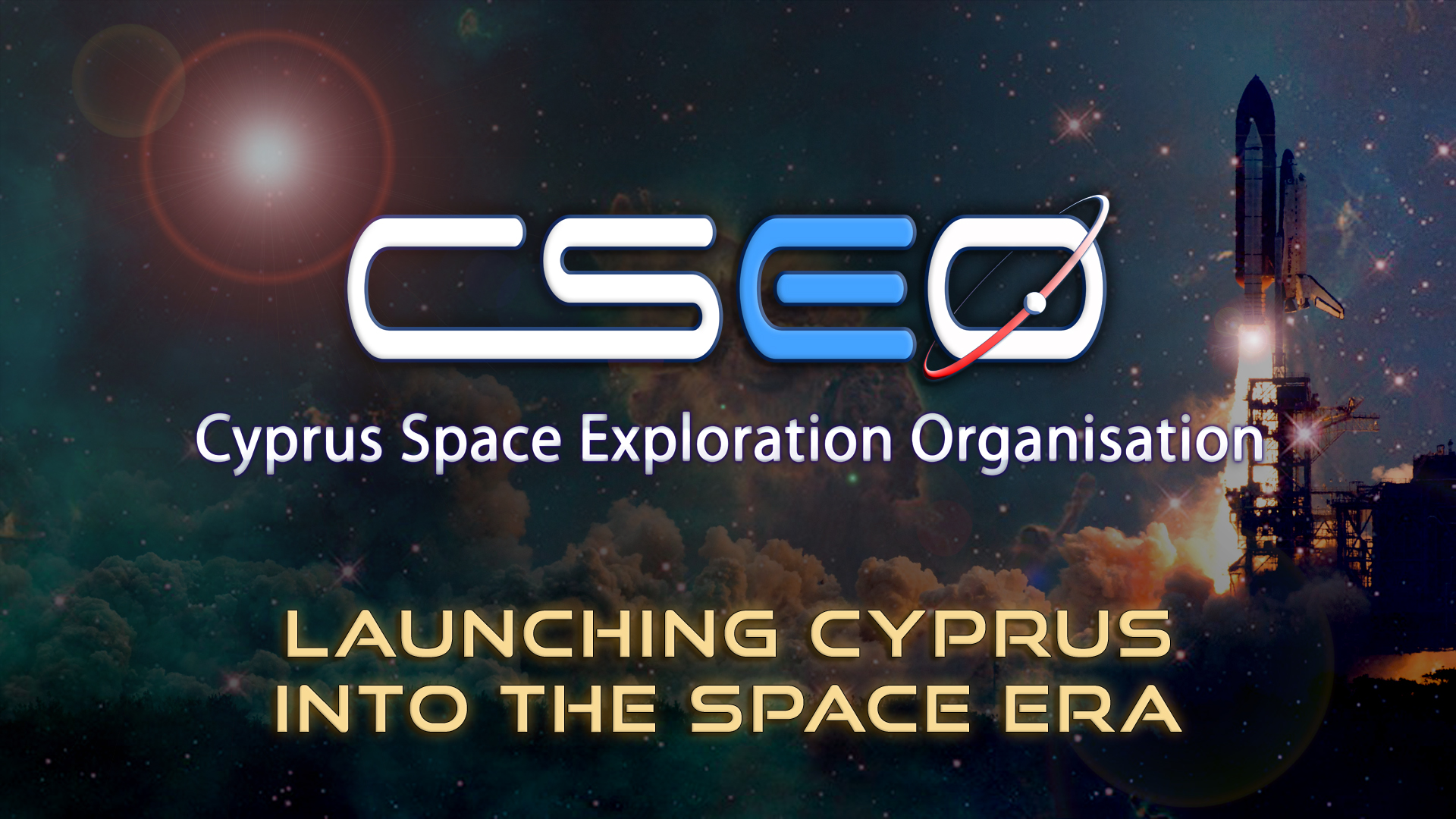
CSEO's tagline

CSEO states its mission and vision as:

Our mission and vision is to galvanise human potential into high-tech innovation and cooperation. The universe and space exploration has always fascinated the human spirit and unites humanity under the same sky. Hence we - the Cyprus Space Exploration Organisation (CSEO) - with our vision and goals as our compass have been highly active in forging international collaborations and igniting innovation and technological growth, with impressive and captivating results that are of public benefit.

When joining the IAF, CSEO stated that its first mission was to promote Cyprus as one of the leading space-faring nations, and stated the following goals in relation to Cyprus:

- Place Cyprus on the space industry map,
- Conduct space related R & D,
- Promote innovation through the development and support of a local internal market for space,
- Increase local technological competitiveness,
- Leverage on local intellectual human capital,
- Provide education and training for the future generation of space scientists and engineers, from an early age, in & out of schools,
- Enhance and promote academic and industrial collaboration, through joint project participation.

== Pillars and activities ==
CSEO operates with the following four basic pillars: “Education and Outreach”, “R&D”, “Industry”, and “International Relations and Collaboration”.

CSEO main activities concentrate on:

- Promoting scientific research and development in space exploration, astronautics and astrophysics,
- Actively developing the local space industry,
- Bridging academic and industrial collaboration,
- Galvanizing the potential of the local and global talents into applied high-tech innovation,
- Contributing to turning high-tech industry into a vibrant sector with high employment opportunities,
- Bringing widespread collaboration with other space-faring nations in science, technology and space missions,
- Actively encouraging and promoting internationally and domestically, the future generation of scientists, via education and outreach, with continuous in-and-out-of-school programs and media outreach.

== International Space Cooperation ==
=== Mars Upper Atmosphere Network ===
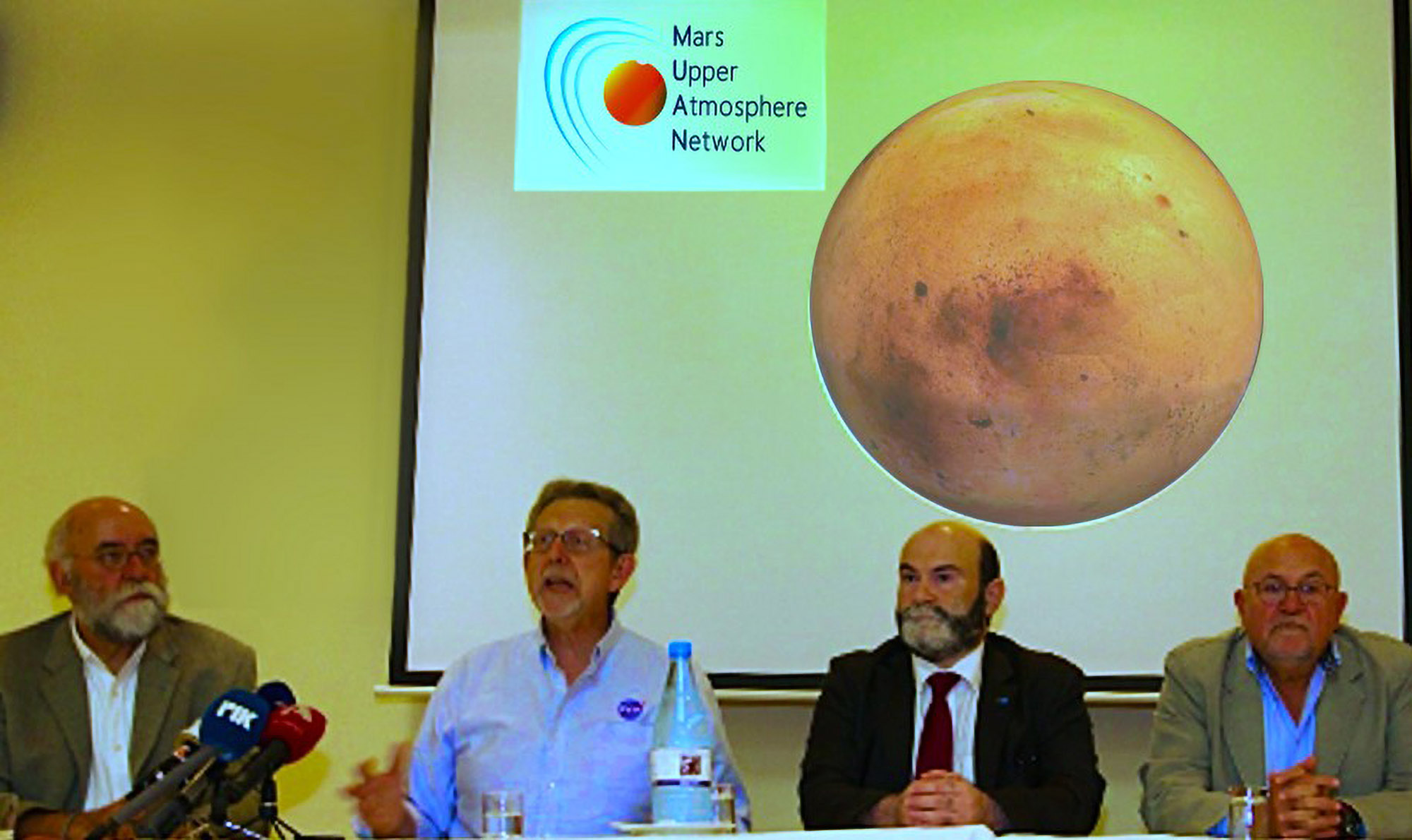
Press Conference where Chief Scientist of NASA announces Nicosia as permanent host of MUAN.

In October 2018, the 10th Mars Upper Atmosphere Network (MUAN) workshop was organised by CSEO in Cyprus.

During this workshop it was decided that MUAN is permanently based in Nicosia, Cyprus.

MUAN Workshop Decision:

At the concluding high-level session of the tenth MUAN Jubilee workshop in Nicosia, on October 19, 2018, the representatives of the participating countries and agencies (e.g. USA - NASA, RUSSIA - IKI, India, UK, France, Italy, Germany etc) unanimously decided that Nicosia, Cyprus would become the permanent base for the MUAN and be hosted by the Cyprus Space Exploration Organisation (CSEO), thus consolidating scientific efforts, mission data, gatherings, as well as coordinating simultaneous observations of upper atmosphere-and-plasma-instruments on Mars space missions.

=== First Online Global Moon Village Workshop and Symposium ===
CSEO in cooperation with the Moon Village Association, organized and hosted in Cyprus the First Online Global Moon Village Workshop and Symposium. This was keynoted by senior officials of some of the worlds leading space agencies, such as the director of the UNOOSA, the Associated Administrator of NASA, the director general of the European Space Agency, JAXA, ISRO and many others. The purpose of the symposium was to bring together the lunar stakeholders and lunar community from all over the world to discuss on-going and planned Moon programs, to facilitate international collaboration on lunar exploration, as well as to agree on Best Practices for Sustainable Lunar Activities.

=== Global Experts Group on Sustainable Lunar Activities (GEGSLA) ===
CSEO has been supportive of international collaboration for the return of humanity to the moon and the creation of bases and colonies. In this effort CSEO in cooperation with the Moon Village Association have presented at UNOOSA, during the February 2020 meetings in Vienna, the goals of the Best Practices for Sustainable Lunar Activities and invited nations to join this effort. During the First Online Global Moon Village Workshop and Symposium, hosted by CSEO in Nicosia - Cyprus in November 2020, it was announced that it was agreed by international stakeholders to form the Global Experts Group on Sustainable Lunar Activities (GEGSLA) that would invite all nations and lunar stakeholders (industry, academia and other), to participate in this international platform to address critical issues with the goal of de-risking future lunar missions and increasing global cooperation for lunar exploration and settlement. GEGSLA had its kick-off meeting on 25 February 2021. The Republic of Cyprus is represented in GEGSLA by CSEO and its President Mr George A Danos. Furthermore, the GEGSLA Implementation Support Officer is employed by CSEO as part of the ongoing cooperation agreement between CSEO and MVA.

=== United Nations: International Moon Day (IMD) ===
The United Nations General Assembly (UNGA) have approved the proclamation for the International Moon Day (IMD), celebrated every year on July 20 (when the first human set foot on the surface of the Moon in 1969), starting in 2022. The Moon Village Association and the United Nations Office for Outer Space Affairs (UNOOSA) in cooperation with CSEO, officially announced the decision of the UNGA and the proclamation of the IMD at a press conference held at CSEO's offices in Cyprus, on 14 December 2021. CSEO's president stated: “Cyprus is the launchpad of the events to celebrate the International Moon Day following the successful [MVA] workshop [that CSEO hosted] earlier this month”.

In March 2022, during the International Astronautical Federation (IAF) Spring Meetings, CSEO was also announced as the first “Founding Member” of the International Moon Day.

=== COSPAR - Space Innovation Lab: Artificial Intelligence and Space Weather prediction ===
In 2020, the president of CSEO, has been appointed as vice-chair of the COSPAR Panel on Innovative Solutions (PoIS). Through this role he managed the creation of the Space Innovation Lab of COSPAR in cooperation with CSEO, bridging the science of space weather with the engineering tools of artificial intelligence, analyzing space weather data and potentially predicting dangerous storms heading towards our planet and raising a warning alarm if needed.

During the 44th COSPAR General Assembly in July 2022, as Main Scientific Organizer (MSO) of the PoIS.2 panel session, he led the effort of bridging global industry and scientific community, towards the above goals.

== CSEO Discovery Alpha ==
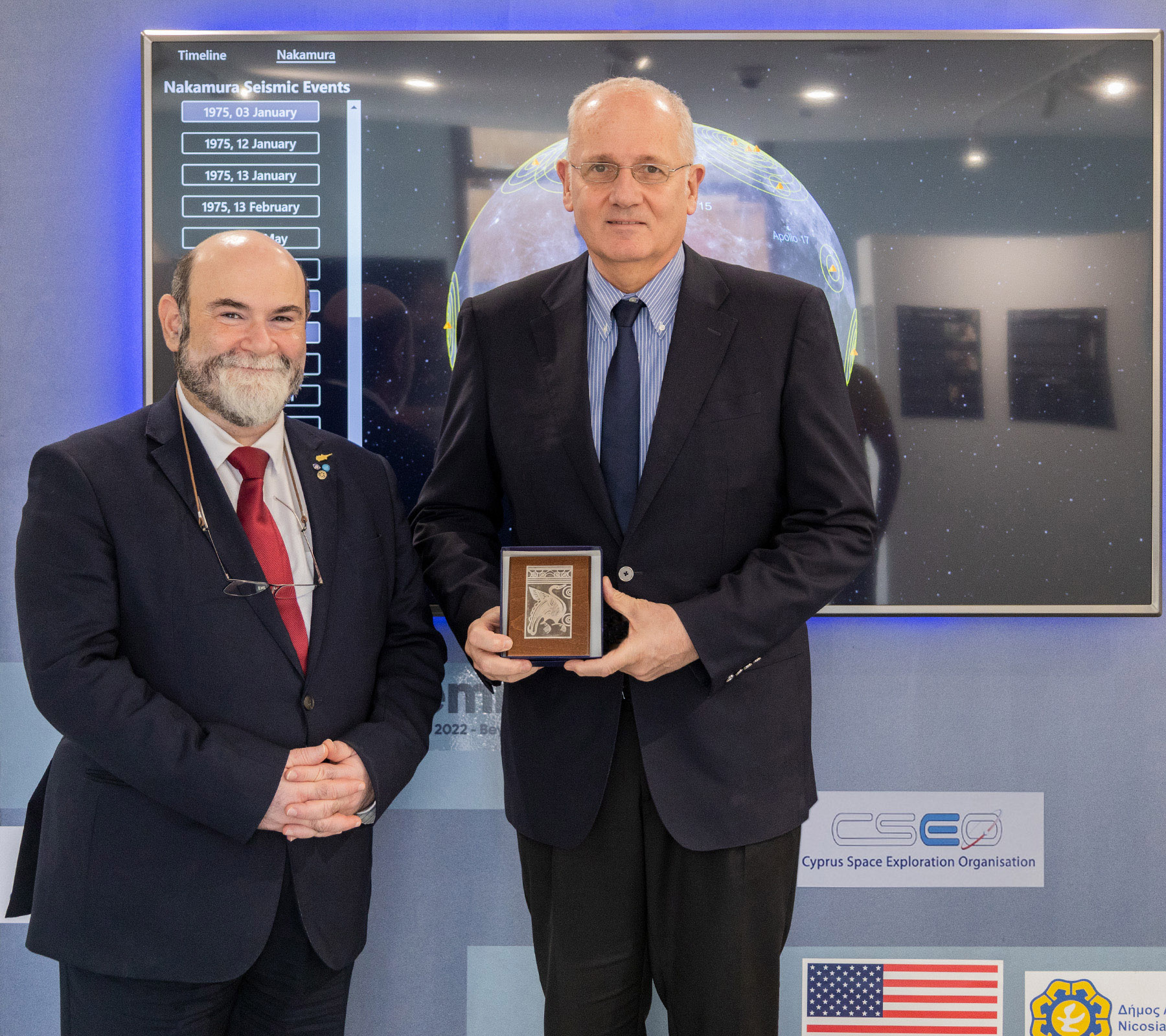
Visit of Jean-Yves Le Gall, President of International Astronautical Federation

In 2021, CSEO established its first space research center and was given the name CSEO Discovery Alpha.

The center houses CSEO's space research projects, research teams and hosts the majority of its innovation, educational and outreach activities. It also hosts the International Astronomy Education Center, OAE Cyprus, of the IAU (see below), the Mars Upper Atmosphere Network (MUAN) (see below), and the Space Innovation Laboratory (under the auspices of the International Committee on Space Research).

Since its opening, it has received visits form many distinguished international delegates as well as visits from EU officials, ambassadors, domestic personalities and heads of state.

The facility includes laboratories for space engineering projects, signal processing and simulation workstations as well as space qualifications equipment.

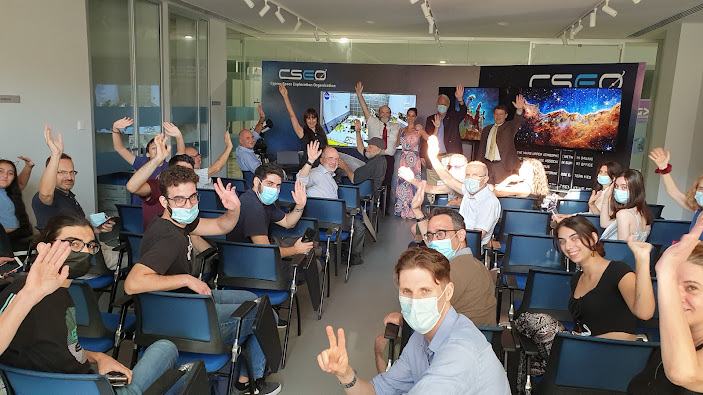
Celebration event for the first images of the JWST

Since December 2022, the center hosts the "Apollo to Artemis" exhibition that was created with the support of the U.S. Embassy in Cyprus. The exhibition contains a piece of a moon meteorite as well as a small martian meteorite. Notably, the Apollo 17 Goodwill Moon rock, a piece of extraterrestrial history that was collected during the United States’ Apollo 17 mission in December 1972, when it was returned in Cyprus after 50 years, it was placed on its first and only public display, between December 8–15, at the "Apollo to Artemis" exhibition.

The center's public events facilities have hosted events such as the simulcast of the first space images of the James Webb Space Telescope, having been selected by NASA and ESA as one of the hosts for the global celebrations.

In July 2023, it also hosted the celebrations of the UN International Moon Day.

At the end of 2023, CSEO Discovery Alpha concluded its operations, marking the end of an era as it transitions into the Cyprus Space Research Centre.

== Cyprus Space Research Centre ==
In December 2023, CSEO started the implementation of the Cyprus Space Research Centre, a Strategic Infrastructure project co-funded by the European Union and the Research and Innovation Foundation (RIF).

As humanity prepares to return to the Moon, CSEO's Strategic Infrastructure project leverages the Organisation's international network to create a global hub in Cyprus that will pursue space research with far-reaching effects.

== Research Projects ==
CSEO and its spin-off companies are involved in multiple EU Horizon 2020, ESA and other funded space research programs. Some characteristic examples are:

=== Dating the sediments of Mars ===
One of the space research programs, that CSEO is participating in, involves the construction of leading-edge instrumentation for the absolute dating of Martian sediments (project IN-TIME). An announcement was made by CSEO that space equipment is aimed to be tested on the Troodos Mountains (a mountain-range that has geological similarities with the red planet), before sending this instruments to Mars to measure the age of the planet's soil (sediments).

In October 2021, CSEO in cooperation with the IN-TIME consortium (includes EU and US institutions, as well as the advisory of NASA), announced that the instrumentation of this project will be both integrated and tested in Cyprus. This was an outcome of a thorough field trip in Cyprus identifying ideal test locations, as well as negotiating the integration decision.

=== Assisting Economy from Space during disaster periods (like COVID-19) ===
Space technologies connected with Artificial Intelligence (AI) and machine learning techniques are utilized in a European consortium project to control disasters like the COVID-19 pandemic. This project will produce a prototype service based on Copernicus data, using automatic image processing supported by artificial intelligence integrated with modelling and statistic and geospatial data into an IT platform able to provide econometric and epidemiologic nowcasting and forecasting data.

== Space Education ==
CSEO is actively involved in space-related educational activities to stimulate the interest of the younger generation in the field of science and space research. One of CSEO's pillars of primary focus is the education and empowerment of young people of all ages and backgrounds in its area of expertise, with the ultimate objective of assisting in the development of a highly skilled youth, equipped to address contemporary and future scientific challenges.

=== International Astronomy Education Center, OAE Cyprus ===
The International Astronomical Union (IAU), via its Office of Astronomy for Education (OAE), issued a call in 2020 to establish an international network of OAE Centers and Nodes to collaborate in OAE's mission to support astronomy education worldwide. CSEO proposed the creation of the “International Astronomy Education Center, OAE Cyprus”. In August 2021, an agreement was signed between CSEO and the IAU for the establishment of this center. The center has a global scope, and a specialization on the modernization of science centers and planetariums, education in space science, planetary science, climate change and the upper atmosphere.

During the signing, President Danos said “We are honoured that the IAU Office for Astronomy Education has recognised the experience of the Cyprus Space Exploration Organisation (CSEO) and has selected Cyprus to host an international astronomy education center, the OAE Center Cyprus. CSEO is committed to working with the IAU and OAE in spreading astronomy education, capacity building, seeding the next generation of scientists and engineers, who will make the next big discoveries in astronomy and cosmology. Cyprus’s location in the crossroads between three continents and CSEO’s friendly international relations, will allow this Center to act as a regional hub and education bridge, for peaceful cooperation and synergy, under one sky”.

=== CSEO Space Club ===
As part of these activities CSEO runs the CSEO Space Club in schools throughout the island. This club is an outreach and education project in Cyprus, in association with the International Space Community, for school classes and afternoon societies. It brings to schools training and educational material, as well as astronauts and space engineers in order to prepare and build the next generation of scientists and engineers.

=== Mission X - Train Like an Astronaut ===
The NASA/ESA program “Mission X - Train Like an Astronaut” is disseminated in Cyprus throughout schools by CSEO since 2017. The purpose of Mission X is to train students like astronauts, teach principles of healthy eating and exercise, and provide scientific knowledge and engineering skills needed in space exploration.

== Space and Astronomy outreach ==
=== Space Week ===
CSEO organises Space Week annually since 2013, promoting space to the people of Cyprus.

=== First Cypriot Space Documentary ===
CSEO co-produced the First Cypriot Space Documentary with Tetraktys-Films, promoting space research on the island. It was premiered at the CYTA Headquarters in November 2016 and then on National TV channel CyBC 1 the following month.

=== Celebrating the 50th Apollo 11 Moon Landing Anniversary ===
Astronaut Dr. Anna Lee Fisher was invited to Cyprus in order to celebrate the 50th Apollo 11 Anniversary in cooperation with the US Embassy in Cyprus. The main celebration event was held at the Nicosia Municipal Theatre on 5 December 2019 and attended by over a thousand guests. The event was opened by the US Ambassador and the president of CSEO, whilst the main speaker was Astronaut Fisher. The event was also video greeted by NASA's Ambassador to Europe, Tim Tawney, and concluded with an operatic performance of Verdi's La Traviata - Brindisi by the Limassol Operatic Stage Choir.

=== Naming a star and its exoplanet ===
As part of the NameExoWorlds project, the 100 years’ celebrations of the International Astronomical Union (IAU), CSEO as National Member of the IAU, organized a campaign in Cyprus to select names for a star (HD 168746) and its exoplanet. Over 300 names were proposed by the public. These went to a public vote in November 2019 for a week. A few thousands voted and the names that were selected and approved by the IAU in December 2019, were Alasia (Αλάσια or Alashiya) and Onasilos (Ονάσιλος). Via this campaign, Alasia became one of 448 stars on the sky that have names which are officially approved by the International Astronomical Union.

=== 2030: SpaceWorks - Series of global webinars ===
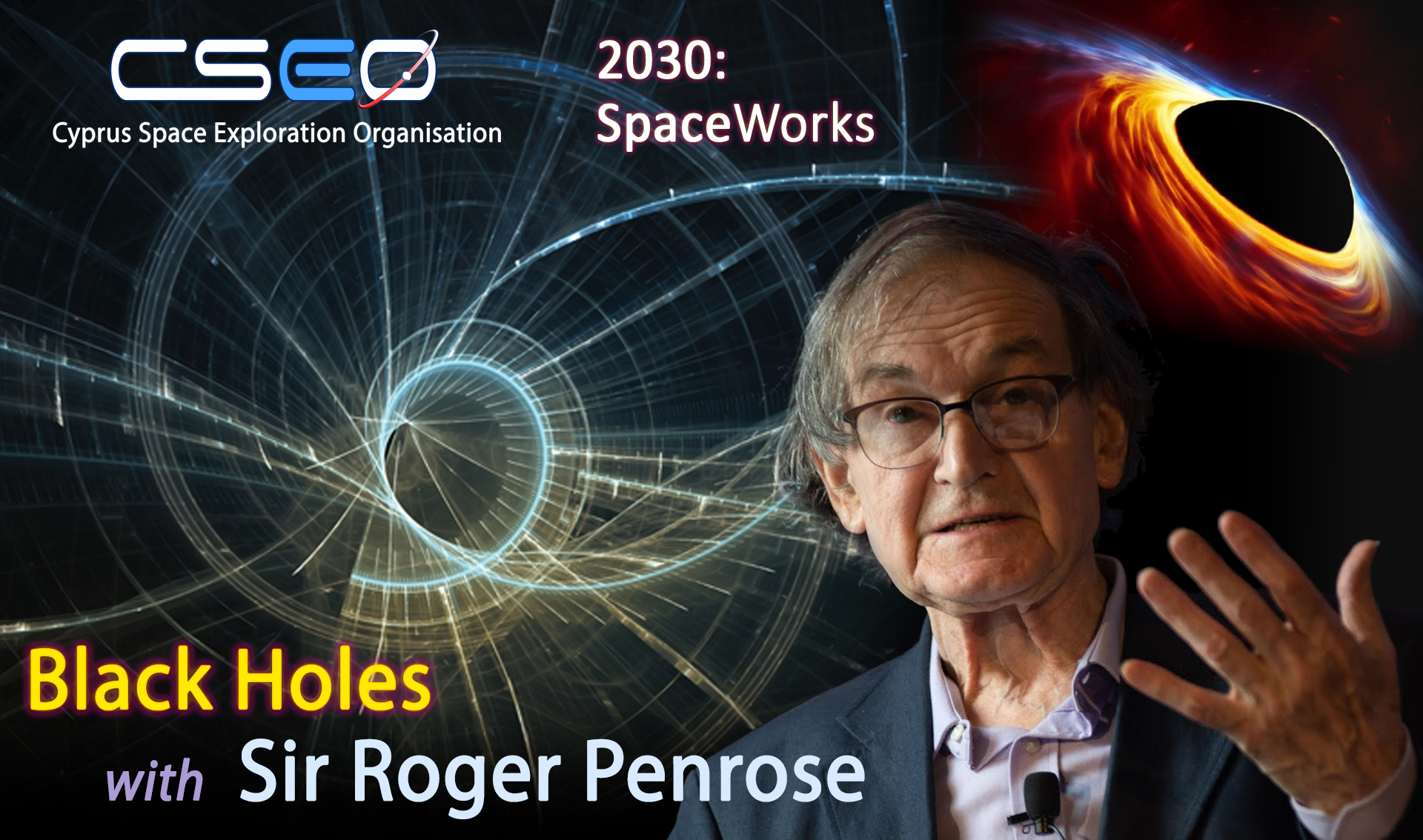
2030: SpaceWorks premiere episode with Sir Roger Penrose

In September 2020, CSEO launched a global series of webinars with the goal of seeding the next generation of scientists. These webinars feature the world's brightest minds, covering space exploration, astronomy and cosmology. The webinars address the advancements and challenges expected in the next decade, in returning to the Moon, sending humans to Mars and gaining scientific knowledge that would be instrumental in protecting our own planet. The webpage of 2030: SpaceWorks states:

“With these webinars we want to embrace and seed the next generation of scientists that will drive and achieve these bold goals; the scientists and engineers who will reach these new frontiers and shape humanity’s sustainable future.”

The premiere episode of these webinars, featured Nobel Prize winner Sir Roger Penrose and was viewed by over 85,000 people. During this webinar Sir Roger Penrose made an announcement of new evidence supporting the theory of Conformal Cyclic Cosmology which theorizes that the Big Bang is only the beginning of our current Aeon (Universe Aeons), and that there is a sequence of Big Bangs prior to ours and more to follow at the end of our Universe's time.

The webinars are broadcast live on CSEO's Facebook Page and YouTube Channel.

== CSEO spinoffs and the Cyprus Space Cluster ==
=== Startups and Spinoffs ===
A number of spinoff companies have been created by CSEO. The first was Space Systems Solutions (S3) Ltd that was created in 2016. Its website states:

“CSEO in fulfilling its goal "To Launch Cyprus into the Space Era" and its mandate of building up domestically the space sector and creating jobs and careers in Cyprus, led by example creating a new industrial sector and new economic streams for Cyprus, and created Space Systems Solutions (S3) as its first spin-off. As such, S3 is a win-win initiative and underlines the institutional role of CSEO in the Space Sector of Cyprus.”

=== Cyprus Space Cluster ===
The Cyprus Space Cluster was founded by CSEO in August 2014 and via regular innovation competitions and the “CSEO Space Startups” programme (see below), startup companies are created, supported and added to this cluster.

== Promoting space innovation ==
=== Space startups programme ===
CSEO as founding member of the Copernicus Academy of the European Commission (which aims to utilise space data for improving life on Earth) launched in October 2017 the “CSEO Space Startups” programme, a series of weekly innovation and entrepreneurship workshops that nurture, mentor and educate young talented Cypriots in utilising satellite data into innovative new products and commercial applications, forming startups that will be incubated into space companies.

Through these programs, CSEO attempts to engage with talent and expertise throughout Cyprus, in order to make space accessible but also to provide solutions to issues faced on earth today, trying to stimulate innovation and high-tech entrepreneurship, that they believe will benefit humanity and earth.

=== ActInSpace and DefInSpace in Cyprus ===
Both these space entrepreneurship competitions that are organised by CNES, ESA and the French Space Command, are being hosted in Cyprus as national representative and partner.

In June 2022, the Cypriot team “Galactic Angels” that represented Cyprus in DefInSpace, won the 2nd prize in the international finals.

These competitions stimulate space innovation and entrepreneurship for young scientists and innovators.

=== NASA Space Apps Challenge in Cyprus ===
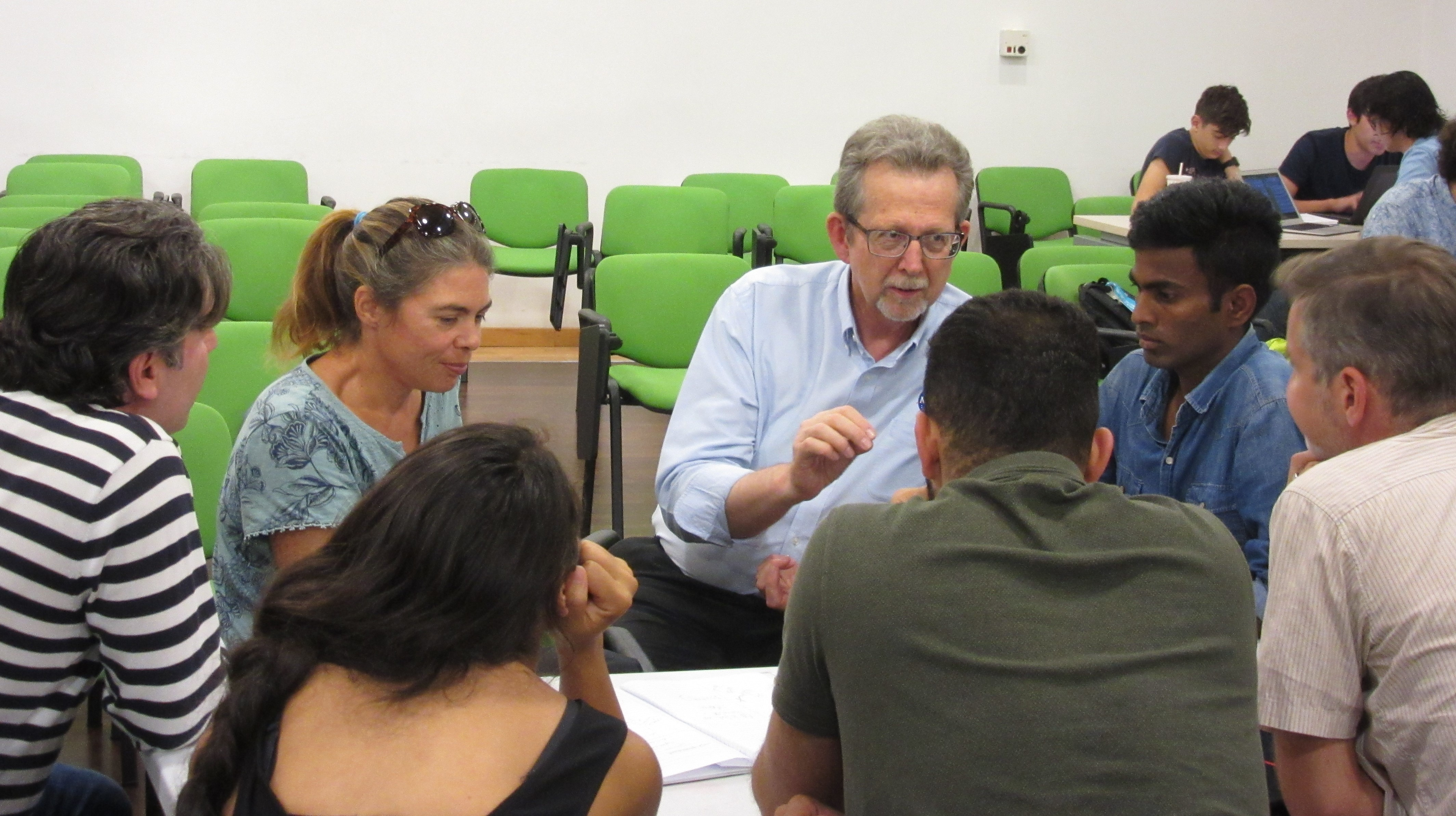
NASA's Chief Scientist mentoring teams at the NASA Space Apps Challenge in Cyprus

Since 2013, CSEO has been actively involved with the NASA Space Apps Challenge in Cyprus (thus far held in Limassol or Nicosia), either by holding events under its auspices or directly organising the challenge.

In 2013, the Cypriot team MarsSense placed 2nd globally for the People's Choice Award at the International Space Apps Challenge.

In 2015, the Cypriot team ArachnoBeeA that won domestically the Space Apps Challenge, went on to become global winner of the International Space Apps Challenge for the “Best Mission Concept”, thus receiving an invitation from NASA to visit the Kennedy Center at Cape Canaveral and participate as guest viewers at a space launch to the ISS.

In 2017, the level of the contestants once again being very high, the CSEO promotes the Cypriot winning teams through major media campaigns. Subsequently, one of the local winning teams, team NestFold goes on to become global winner for the People's Choice Award.

In 2018, NASA's Chief Scientist Dr James Green, who was invited to Cyprus by CSEO for the Mars Upper Atmosphere Network Space Summit, mentored the Cypriot teams at the competition in Nicosia. A team of two 14 year old pupils won the 1st prize on their concept for the colonization of the Moon.

In 2022, the Cypriot team Brute Force was selected by NASA judges as a global winner of the 2022 NASA International Space Apps Challenge for the “Local Impact” award.

In 2024, the Chief Innovation Officer of CSEO, Colm Larkin, who has been organising since 2013 the NASA Space Apps Challenge (Cyprus), ActInSpace (Cyprus), DefInSpace (Cyprus) and the International Moon Village Association Hackathon (globally), that facilitated and mentored the above wins, has been awarded by NASA at a ceremony at NASA HQ for "outstanding leadership in empowering the next generation to address challenges we face on Earth and in space".
