= American Institute of Aeronautics and Astronautics =

Professional society for the field of aerospace engineering

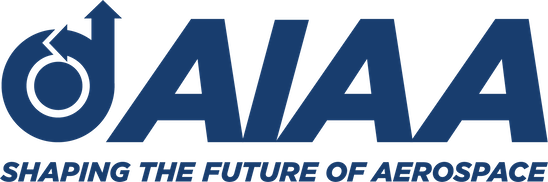
- Founded: January 31, 1963; 63 years ago
- Type: Professional organization
- Origins: Merger of the American Rocket Society and the Institute of the Aerospace Sciences
- Region served: Worldwide
- Method: Industry standards, conferences, publications
- Members: 30,000 (2015)
- Key people: Daniel E. Hastings (president); Clay Mowry (CEO)
- Revenue: US$21 million (2009)
- Website: www.aiaa.org

The American Institute of Aeronautics and Astronautics (AIAA) is a professional society for the field of aerospace engineering. The AIAA is the U.S. representative on the International Astronautical Federation and the International Council of the Aeronautical Sciences. In 2015, it had more than 30,000 members among aerospace professionals worldwide (a majority are American or live in the United States).

== History ==
The AIAA was founded in 1963 from the merger of two earlier societies: the American Rocket Society (ARS), founded in 1930 as the American Interplanetary Society (AIS), and the Institute of the Aerospace Sciences (IAS), founded in 1932 as the Institute of the Aeronautical Sciences. Paul Johnston was the first executive director of the organization. Jim Harford took his seat after 18 months. The newly-formed structure gathered 47 technical committees and one broad technical publication, the AIAA Journal. The AIAA Student Journal was also launched in 1963. The merger also led to the sale of the organizations' former headquarter buildings, and the relocation in the Sperry Rand Building.

In 1967, the Technical Committee on Space and Atmospheric Science launched a study to capture the opinion of its members in California on the UFO phenomenon.

== Activities ==
=== Journals ===
As a major activity, AIAA currently publishes several technical journals. The AIAA Journal is published on a monthly basis and serves as the flagship journal of the society. In January 2015 the Journal of Guidance, Control, and Dynamics became the second AIAA journal published on a monthly basis. The other journals are published bi-monthly and have more specialized topics:

- Journal of Air Transportation (Starting in 2016)
- Journal of Aerospace Information Systems (formerly Journal of Aerospace Computing, Information, and Communication)
- Journal of Aircraft
- Journal of Energy (published from 1977 to 1983)
- Journal of Guidance, Control, and Dynamics
- Journal of Hydronautics (published from 1967 to 1980)
- Journal of Propulsion and Power
- Journal of Spacecraft and Rockets (Starting in 1964)
- Journal of Thermophysics and Heat Transfer

AIAA's flagship magazine Aerospace America was started in 1990 and is distributed monthly to all members, and is published online in digital format. AIAA also produces several series of technical books ranging from education to progress in advanced research topics.

=== Competitions ===
AIAA annually holds design competitions and Design/Build/Fly competitions to provide a real-world design experience for engineering students, both undergraduate and graduate, by giving them the opportunity to validate their analytic studies.

=== Conferences ===
AIAA hosts many conferences and smaller events throughout the year. The largest of those is the AIAA Science and Technology Forum and Exposition ("AIAA SciTech"). Others include AIAA Aviation and Aeronautics Forum and Exposition ("AIAA Aviation"), AIAA Propulsion and Energy Forum and Exposition ("AIAA P&E"), and AIAA Space and Astronautics Forum and Exposition ("AIAA Space").

=== The AIAA Foundation ===
AIAA currently has over 6,500 student members in 160 active student branches, including 12 foreign student branches. The student branches host annual conferences.

The AIAA Foundation is devoted to the education of both practicing and future aerospace professionals. The AIAA Foundation funds numerous scholarships for both undergraduate and graduate students. Undergraduate scholarships range from $2,000 to $2,500. Graduate scholarships are $5,000 or $10,000.

== Awards and lectureships delivered ==
=== Awards ===
- Goddard Astronautics Award: AIAA's highest award for astronautics, endowed by Esther Kisk-Goddard in commemoration of her husband Robert Goddard's pioneering efforts that led to the development of the fields of astronautics.
- Reed Aeronautics Award: AIAA's highest award for aeronautical science and engineering, named for Dr. Sylvanus Albert Reed, pioneer of the use of metal in propeller blades.
- Holt Ashley Award for Aeroelasticity: Given every four years for those who have contributed significantly to the area of aeroelasticity, named after famous aeroelastician Prof. Holt Ashley who served as a faculty member at MIT and Stanford.
- Missile Systems Award: 2 categories, Technical and Management. The Technical Award is presented for a significant accomplishment in developing or using technology that is required for missile systems. The Technical and Management award are presently alternatively at the biannual Missile Sciences Conference. Thus, the awards are presented once every four years.
- Wyld Propulsion Award: Presented annually to honor "outstanding achievement in the development or application of rocket propulsion systems", named after James Hart Wyld.

=== Lectureships ===
- Dryden Lectureship in Research, named for Dr. Hugh L. Dryden
- Durand Lectureship, named for William F. Durand
- von Kármán Lectureship in Astronautics, named for Theodore von Kármán
- Wright Brothers Lectureship in Aeronautics, named for Orville and Wilbur Wright

== See also ==
- International Astronautical Federation
- National Association of Rocketry
- SpaceOps
- Tripoli Rocketry Association
