= Mingori Robinetterie =

- Industry: Plumbing fixtures
- Founded: (1897)
- Headquarters: Mâcon, Burgundy, France
- Website: www.mingorifrance.com

Mingori Robinetterie is a manufacturer of kitchen and bath fixtures. Products manufactured in France include the Ciel de Pluie rainshower.

== History ==
The company was founded in 1897 and attained acclaim in France in 1923 when Cesar Mingori invented the thermostatic mixer. The company has developed many plumbing fixtures that are unique in the industry.
