= Journal of Guidance, Control, and Dynamics =

- Discipline: Aerospace engineering, control theory
- Language: English
- Edited by: Ping Lu

Publication details
- History: 1978–present
- Publisher: American Institute of Aeronautics and Astronautics
- Frequency: Monthly
- Impact factor: 2.024 (2017)

Standard abbreviations
- ISO 4: J. Guid. Control Dyn.

Indexing
- ISSN: 0731-5090 (print); 1533-3884 (web)
- LCCN: 82641129
- OCLC no.: 145378488

Links
- Journal homepage

The Journal of Guidance, Control, and Dynamics is a monthly peer-reviewed scientific journal published by the American Institute of Aeronautics and Astronautics. It covers the science and technology of guidance, control, and dynamics of flight. The editor-in-chief is Ping Lu (San Diego State University). It was established in 1978 as Journal of Guidance and Control, obtaining its current title in 1982.

== Abstracting and indexing ==
The journal is abstracted and indexed in:

- Current Contents/Engineering, Computing & Technology
- EBSCO databases
- Ei Compendex
- Inspec
- METADEX
- Science Citation Index
- Scopus
- zbMATH

According to the Journal Citation Reports, the journal has a 2017 impact factor of 2.024.

== History ==
The journal was published bimonthly until it switched to monthly in 2015. Prior editors have been Donald C. Fraser (1978–1992), Kyle T. Alfriends (1992–1996), and George T. Schmidt (1997–2013).
