= Hellenic Foundation for Culture =

Greek cultural and educational organization

- Founded: 1992; 34 years ago
- Founder: Government of Greece
- Type: Cultural Institution
- Location: Athens, Greece
- Region served: Worldwide
- Product: Greek cultural education
- Key people: Nikos A. Koukis (Chair)

The Hellenic Foundation for Culture (HFC; Greek: Ελληνικό Ίδρυμα Πολιτισμού), founded in 1992, is a cultural and educational organization, based in Athens, which aims to promote Greek language and Greek culture. Professor Ioannis Georgakis, was the prime mover, founder and first President of the Hellenic Foundation for Culture and he had the vision of establishing an institution for Greek culture abroad.

== History ==
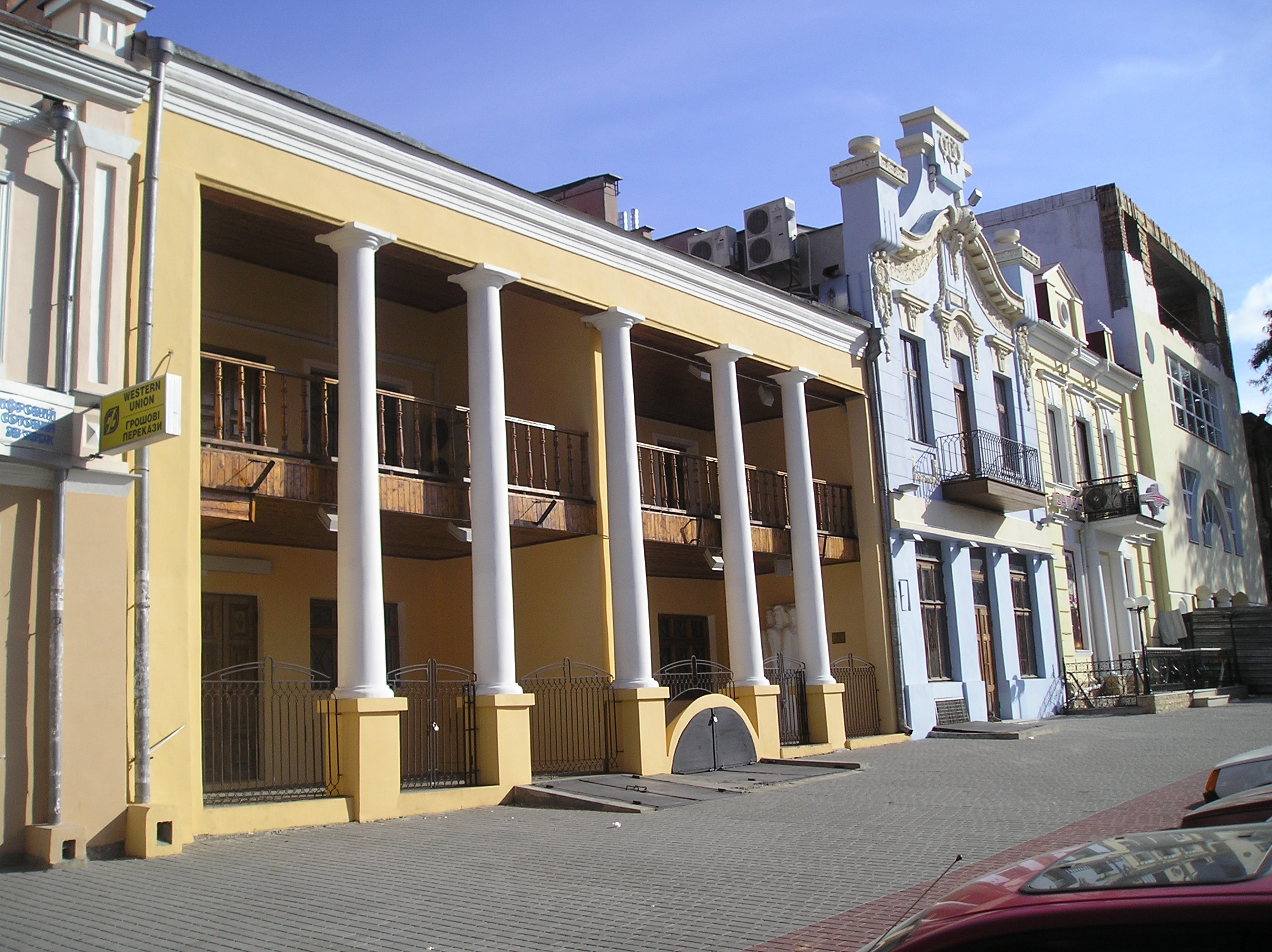
HFC building in Odesa, Ukraine

The initial organizational structure established the operation of a board of directors, which elected the president and the members of the executive board. From 1994 onwards, with successive legislative acts, the structure of the organization was amended and the supervising ministry proposes the president and appoints the members of the executive board.

Ιn 2002, the HFC passed under the supervision of the ministry of culture with the ministry of foreign affairs represented on the board by the head of the directorate for educational and cultural affairs and a representative of the ministry of education also has a seat on the board. In 2014 the National Book Centre of Greece (EKEVI) and the Hellenic Foundation for Culture were merged. The National Book Centre of Greece was responsible to implement national policy to promote books. Publishers, authors, translators, librarians and booksellers were all involved in decision-making and work closely to achieve the centre's objectives.

Ever since its inception, the Board of the HFC has concentrated its effort on the establishment of branches abroad as one of the primary means of achieving its aims, which are the systematic promotion, propagation and development of Hellenic culture abroad. HFC departments abroad: Washington, D.C., Beijing, Alexandria, Belgrade, Berlin, Bucharest, Nicosia, London, Odesa, Sofia and Trieste.

HFC is the head of the Greek network of the Anna Lindh Foundation for Euro-Mediterranean Partnership and Dialogue between Cultures.

The HFC headquarters are located in the former residence of Bodossakis in Palaio Psychiko.

== HFC Museums ==
The Foundation has given considerable weight to the historical and cultural ties existing between the countries under consideration and Greece, such as Odesa and Alexandria. The HFC manages two museums, the only museums maintained by the Hellenic Republic abroad: The Cavafy Museum in Alexandria and the Philike Etairia Museum in Odesa. Both cities with a tradition of close relations with Greece, which made it natural that they should be among the first to be chosen by HFC.

=== Cavafy Museum ===
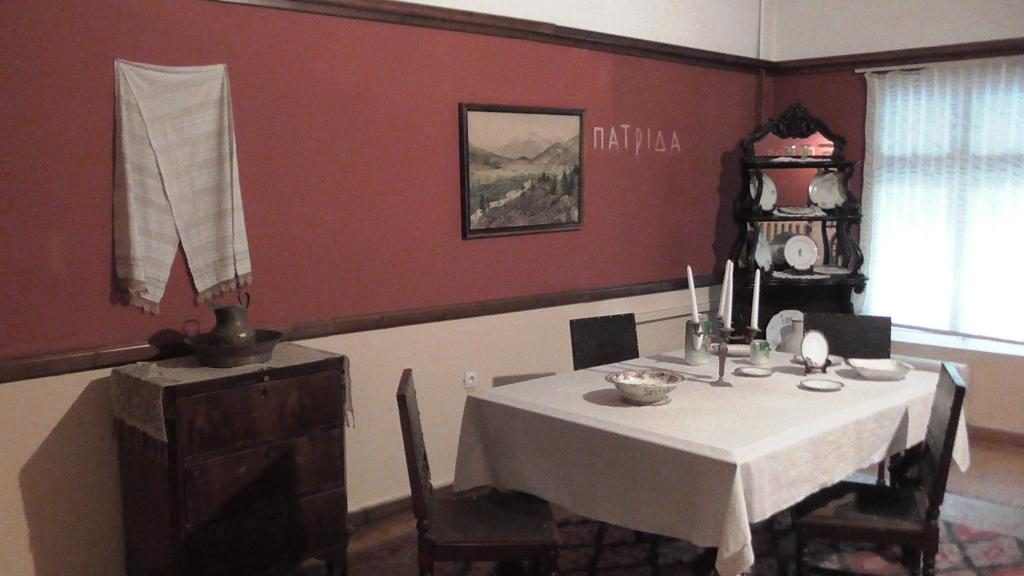
Philike Etairia - dining room

The Cavafy Museum was an initiative of Kostis Moskof (1939–98) in Alexandria at 1992. The museum is one of the houses where C.P. Cavafy lived the last 35 years of his life. The interior of the house has been recreated in detail to resemble the Cavafy's days, the exhibits document the poet's life and work.

=== Philike Etairia Museum ===
The Philike Etairia Museum was established at 1979. In 1994 the museum moved to its historical location, the building where Athanasios Tsakalof, Nikolaos Skoufas and Emmanuel Xanthos founded Philike Etairia (Friendly Society) in 1814. The Friendly Society made preparations for the Greek War of independence of 1821. Prominent Greeks such as Grigorios Maraslis, a great benefactor who was Mayor of Odesa for some years, left their mark permanently on the face of the city.

Between 1991 and 1993 the Hellenic Foundation for Culture restored the Odesa museum in cooperation with private individuals, the Odesa Museum of Regional History and museums from Greece.

== Initiatives ==
Μιλάμε Ελληνικά – We Speak Greek HFC offers lessons in Modern Greek at its branches in Alexandria, Belgrade, Bucharest, Odesa, and Trieste. The Alexandria branch also offers Ancient Greek. All the HFC branches operate as testing centers for the official certification in Greek.

Thessaloniki International Book Fair (TBF) was established in 2004 by EKEVI and since 2014 is under the aegis of HFC. The International Book Fair attracts every year more than 400 publishers, delegations from 30 countries, 65.000 visitors and take place 200 cultural events. Through TBF the Hellenic Foundation for Culture participates in International Book Fairs abroad such as in Frankfurt, in Istanbul, in Kyiv and in Belgrade.

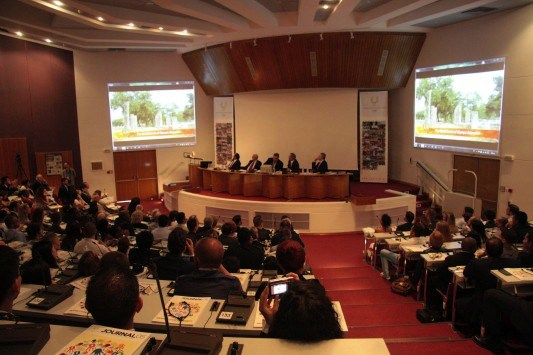
Opening Ceremony at the International Academy, Ancient Olympia

International Cultural Academy was founded in 2014 aiming to bring together researchers, diplomats and stakeholders from the fields of cultural management, media, arts, politics and international relations. The academy offers 5 days of seminars, workshops and excursions and it takes place in venues of historical importance in Greece. Since 2014 the academy has been hosted in Ancient Olympia and at the island of Rhodes.

== HFC presidents ==
- Ioannis Georgakis - 29 June 1992
- Michail Sakellariou - 10 November 1993
- Adamantios Pepelasis - 17 October 1995
- Nikos Oikonomidis - 8 April 1998
- Argiris Fatouros - 26 June 2002
- Stavros Xarchakos - 24 March 2005
- Georgios Babiniotis - 22 May 2006
- Georgios Babiniotis - 13 April 2009
- Christodoulos Yiallourides - 10 February 2014
- Constantinos Tsoukalas - May 2020

== See also ==
- List of museums in Greece
- List of World Heritage Sites in Greece
- Hellenic studies
