= SpaceOps =

- Founded: Late June 1990
- Type: Committee Organization
- Origins: "Ground Data Systems for Spacecraft" symposium, organized by ESA in 1990
- Region served: Worldwide
- Method: Space Operations Standards, Conferences, Publications, Awards, online Journal (ISSN No. 2410-0005) and online SpaceOps Conference archive
- Members: Space Agencies, Academia, Industry
- Website: www.spaceops.org

SpaceOps (also referred to as the International Committee on Technical Interchange for Space Mission Operations and Ground Data Systems) is an international committee organisation formed in 1992 to "promote and maintain an international community of space operations experts".

Currently, thirteen space agencies are members of the organization. SpaceOps also has non-space agency members from academia and industry.

== Conferences ==
SpaceOps Organization has held fifteen biennial conferences hosted by various countries around the world. These international fora have discussed operations principles, methods, cross-support and tools, management and technical interchange.

=== Future Conferences ===
- SpaceOps 2027 - Munich, Germany, hosted by: DLR & DLR GfR

=== Most Recent Conferences ===
- Montreal, Canada, hosted by: Canadian Space Agency, 2025
- Dubai, United Arab Emirates, hosted by: MBRSC, 2023
- Capetown, South Africa, SANSA, 2021. It was held virtually and was shifted from the original 2020 date due to COVID-19.
- Marseille, France, CNES, 2018
- Daejeon, South Korea, hosted by: KARI, 2016

== Publications ==
In 2004, the AIAA Space Operations and Support Technical Committee partnered with the SpaceOps Organization to publish the Journal of Space Operations & Communicator, a peer-reviewed journal dedicated to spaceflight operations and ground support.

Since 2006 most of the conference hosts have decided to publish a post-conference book. These books contain around 30 of the best papers that have been handed in for the conference. The selected papers were all updated, corrected and in many cases extended by the authors following their nomination at the conference.

== Awards program ==
Through its awards program, the SpaceOps Organization recognizes outstanding achievement by individuals and teams in the space operations field. The “International SpaceOps Exceptional Achievement Medal". award recognizes an individual who has distinguished himself or herself in the field of space operations and support.
