= Agios Georgios, Argyrades =

Agios Georgios, Argyrades Άγιος Γεώργιος Αργυράδων
- Settlement
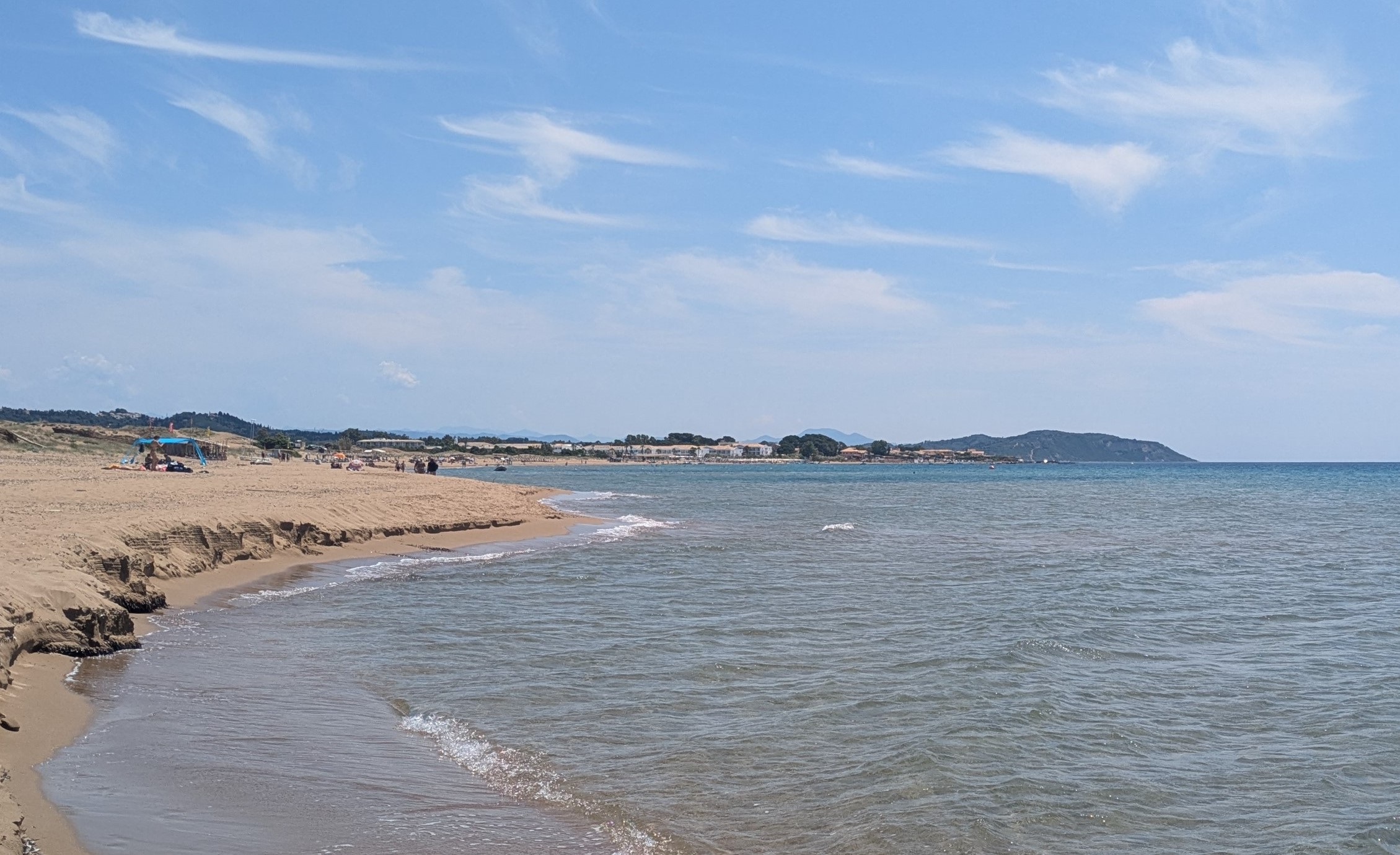
- View looking south of Agios Georgios, Argyrades on Issos Beach

- Location within Greece
- Coordinates: 39°26′N 19°58′E
- Country: Greece
- Administrative region: Ionian Islands
- Regional unit: Corfu
- Municipality: South Corfu
- Municipal unit: Korissia

Population (2011)
  - Community: 508
- Time zone: UTC+2 (EET)
  - Summer (DST): UTC+3 (EEST)
- Vehicle registration: ΚΥ

Agios Georgios, Argyrades (Άγιος Γεώργιος Αργυράδων) is a seaside village located in the southern part of Corfu, Greece. It is part of the municipal unit of Korissia and falls under the jurisdiction of the municipality of South Corfu. The village is a constituent of the community of Argyrades, which also includes the settlements of Marathias and Neochoraki. It lies about 4 kilometers west of Argyrades, 8 kilometers northwest of Lefkimmi, and approximately 30 kilometers south of Corfu Town.

Agios Georgios is also referred to as Agios Georgios South to distinguish it from another village of the same name located in northern Corfu. Tourism is the main economic activity in the area, supported by small-scale agriculture and fishing. The beachfront hosts a variety of tavernas, apartments, and water sports facilities catering to both local and international visitors.

== Issos Beach ==
To the north of Agios Georgios is Issos Beach, a popular destination known for its sand dunes, shallow waters, and proximity to the protected Korission Lagoon, a designated Natura 2000 site. The beach was used as a filming location for the 1981 James Bond movie For Your Eyes Only. The lagoon and surrounding dunes form a significant natural habitat, supporting birds and coastal flora.

== See also ==
- List of settlements in the Corfu regional unit
