= Bastatika =

Greek village in Lefkimmi, Corfu

Coordinates: 39°24′N 20°04′E

Bastatika is a Greek village in Lefkimmi, Corfu, Ionian Islands.

The southern part of Corfu 44 km from the town center, this area is near Neochori. The place exists prior to 1880 and it derives from the surname Bastas. The surname probably means originating from Bastia. (Sagiada Thesprotias).

In Bastia Thesprotias in the beginning of the 15th century the Venetians had built a wooden castle-fence-fortress (bastonium) to control the salt lake naming accordingly the area.

In local dialect Bastas means bastard. This is found in the village nearby Paleochori since 1542.

In 1920 there were 79 inhabitants and in 1961 there were 176. Since then Bastatika has been annexed to the community Paleochori.
