= Perivoli, Corfu =

Perivoli Περιβόλι
- Community
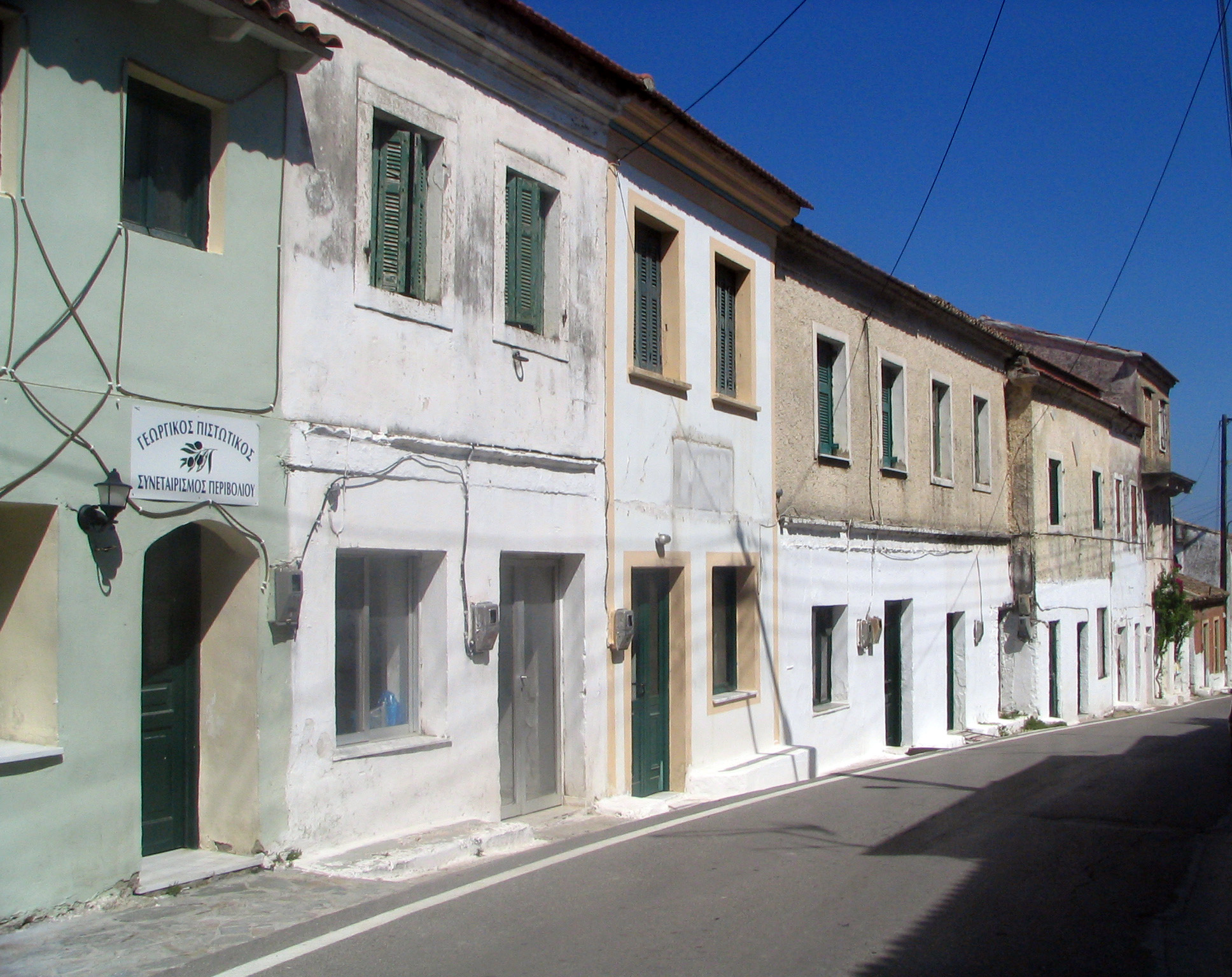
- Perivoli

- Location within Greece
- Coordinates: 39°25′N 20°01′E
- Country: Greece
- Administrative region: Ionian Islands
- Regional unit: Corfu
- Municipality: South Corfu
- Municipal unit: Korissia

Population (2021)
  - Community: 1,297
- Time zone: UTC+2 (EET)
  - Summer (DST): UTC+3 (EEST)
- Vehicle registration: ΚΥ

Perivoli (Greek: Περιβόλι) is a village and a community in the southern part of the island of Corfu, Greece. It is part of the municipal unit of Korissia. The community includes the village Potamia. Perivoli is 1 km northwest of Vitalades, 4 km west of Lefkimmi, 4 km southeast of Argyrades and 24 km south of the city of Corfu. The Greek National Road 25 (Corfu - Argyrades - Lefkimmi) passes through the village. The small fishing port Kalyviotis is to the north, and the Agia Varvara beach is to the southwest.

== Population ==
Year	Town population	Community population
1981	-	1,334
1991	1,382	-
2001	1,420	1,441
2011	1,378	1,427
2021	1,283	1,297

== See also ==
- List of settlements in the Corfu regional unit
