= Vitalades =

Vitalades Βιταλάδες
- Community
- Location within Greece
- Coordinates: 39°24′N 20°01′E
- Country: Greece
- Administrative region: Ionian Islands
- Regional unit: Corfu
- Municipality: South Corfu
- Municipal unit: Lefkimmi

Population (2021)
  - Community: 485
- Time zone: UTC+2 (EET)
  - Summer (DST): UTC+3 (EEST)
- Vehicle registration: ΚΥ

Vitalades (Greek: Βιταλάδες) is a village and a community in the southwestern part of the island of Corfu. It is part of the municipal unit of Lefkimmi. The community includes the village Gardenos. It is situated between low hills, 1 kilometre (0.62 miles) southeast of Perivoli and 4 kilometres (2.5 miles) southwest of Lefkimmi. Vitalades is one of several villages on the island that have the suffix -ades, e.g. Argyrades.

== Population ==
Year	Settlement population	Community population
1981	495	-
1991	532	-
2001	475	538
2011	442	524
2021	466	485

== See also ==
- List of settlements in the Corfu regional unit
