= Kokoretsi =

Grilled lamb or goat intestine dish

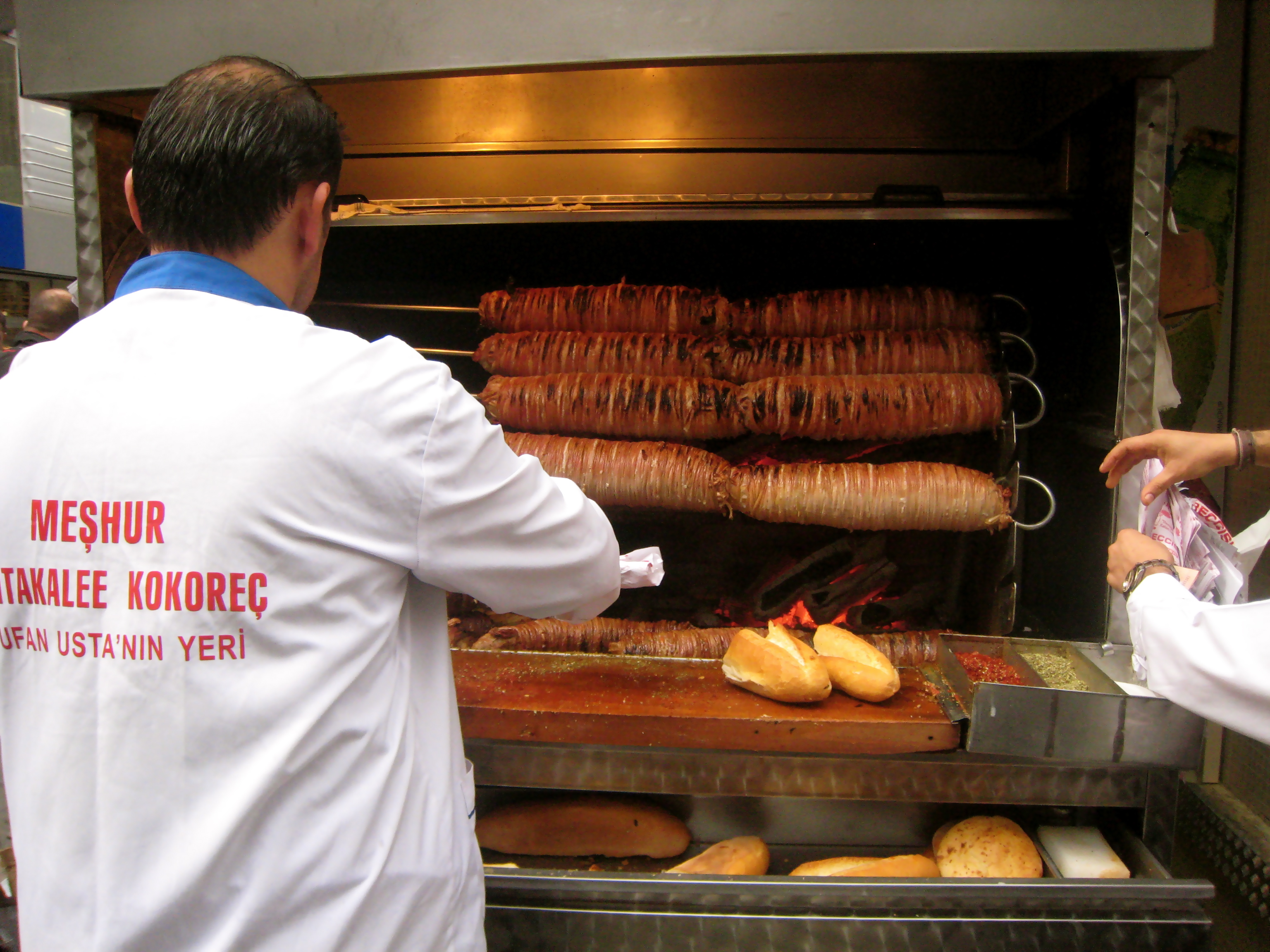
- Multiple rolls of kokoretsi roasting on wood fire in İzmir, Turkey
- Type: Meat dish
- Place of origin: Byzantine Empire
- Region or state: Balkans, Asia Minor
- Main ingredients: Lamb or goat intestines, offal (sweetbreads, hearts, lungs or kidneys)

Kokoretsi (Greek: κοκορέτσι) or kokoreç is a dish of the Balkans and Anatolia (Asia Minor), consisting of lamb or goat intestines wrapped around seasoned offal, including sweetbreads, hearts, lungs, or kidneys, and typically grilled; a variant consists of chopped innards cooked on a griddle. The intestines of suckling lambs are preferred.

== History and names ==
A dish identical to modern kokoretsi is first attested in the cuisine of the Byzantines. They called it πλεκτήν (plektín), κοιλιόχορδα (koilióchorda), or χορδόκοιλα (chordókoila); the latter two are preserved with the meaning of wrapped intestines in the Greek idioms of Corfu as τσοιλίχουρδα (tsoilíchourda), of Plovdiv as χορδόκοιλα (chordókoila), of Chios as σοιλίγουρδα (soilígourda), of Pontians as χορδόγκοιλα (chordógkoila), and in part, of Zagori and Argyrades as χορδή (chordí), of Thessaly as χουρδή (chourdí), of northern Peloponnese as κορδιά (kordiá) or κόρδα (kórda), and of Vogatsiko as κουρδί (kourdí). Other names found in medieval texts are γαρδούμιον (gardoúmion) and γαρδούμενον (gardoúmenon), from which γαρδούμπα (gardoúmpa) and γαρδουμπάκια (gardoumpákia) derive, as alternative names for a smaller version of kokoretsi in Greece. Τhe Medieval Greek γαρδούμιον (gardoúmion) in turn derives from Latin caldumen; from caldus or calidus 'warm, hot'.

The Babiniotis Dictionary writes that the Greek word κοκορέτσι (kokorétsi) comes from Albanian kukurec. The Nişanyan dictionary calls Albanian kukurec a loanword from Serbo-Croatian and Bulgarian kukuruza, originally meaning corncob. Nişanyan also asserts that the Greek word is not derived from the Albanian kukurec, but that they were both loaned from South Slavic languages independently. The Aromanian name is cucureci.

The Turkish word kokoreç was first attested in Lokanta Esrarı; a short story written in 1920 by the Turkish author Ömer Seyfettin. The author wrote that the first time he heard of kokoreç, was when it was presented to him as a specialty of an Athenian who worked in an Istanbul restaurant; it was described as a Greek dish made from small lamb intestines. The Turkish word derives from the Greek κοκορέτσι (kokorétsi).

== Preparation ==
The offal, along with some fat, is washed and cut into ½ to ¾-inch thick pieces, and lightly seasoned with lemon, olive oil, oregano, salt, pepper, and sometimes garlic. The intestine is turned inside out and carefully washed, then rubbed with salt and often soaked in vinegar or lemon juice and water.

The filling meats are threaded onto a long skewer and wrapped with the intestine to hold them together, forming a compact roll usually about 16–24 inches long by 1½–3 inches in diameter.

Kokoretsi is usually roasted on a horizontal skewer over a charcoal, gas, or electrical burner, and may be basted with lemon juice and olive oil.

A quite different preparation mixes the chopped innards with chopped tomatoes and green peppers, and then cooks them on a large griddle with hot red pepper and oregano added. The cook constantly mixes and chops the mixture using two spatulas. When done, the dish is kept warm aside on the griddle until someone orders a serving.

== Serving ==
The cooked kokoretsi is chopped or sliced, sprinkled with oregano, and served on a plate. Sometimes it is served on a piece of flatbread. Some add tomatoes or spices in it. It may also (especially in Turkey) be served in half a baguette or in a sandwich bun, plain or garnished, almost always with oregano and red pepper. In Turkey, common side dishes are pickled peppers or cucumbers. It is often seasoned with lemon, oregano, salt, a pepper, and typically accompanied by wine or rakı.

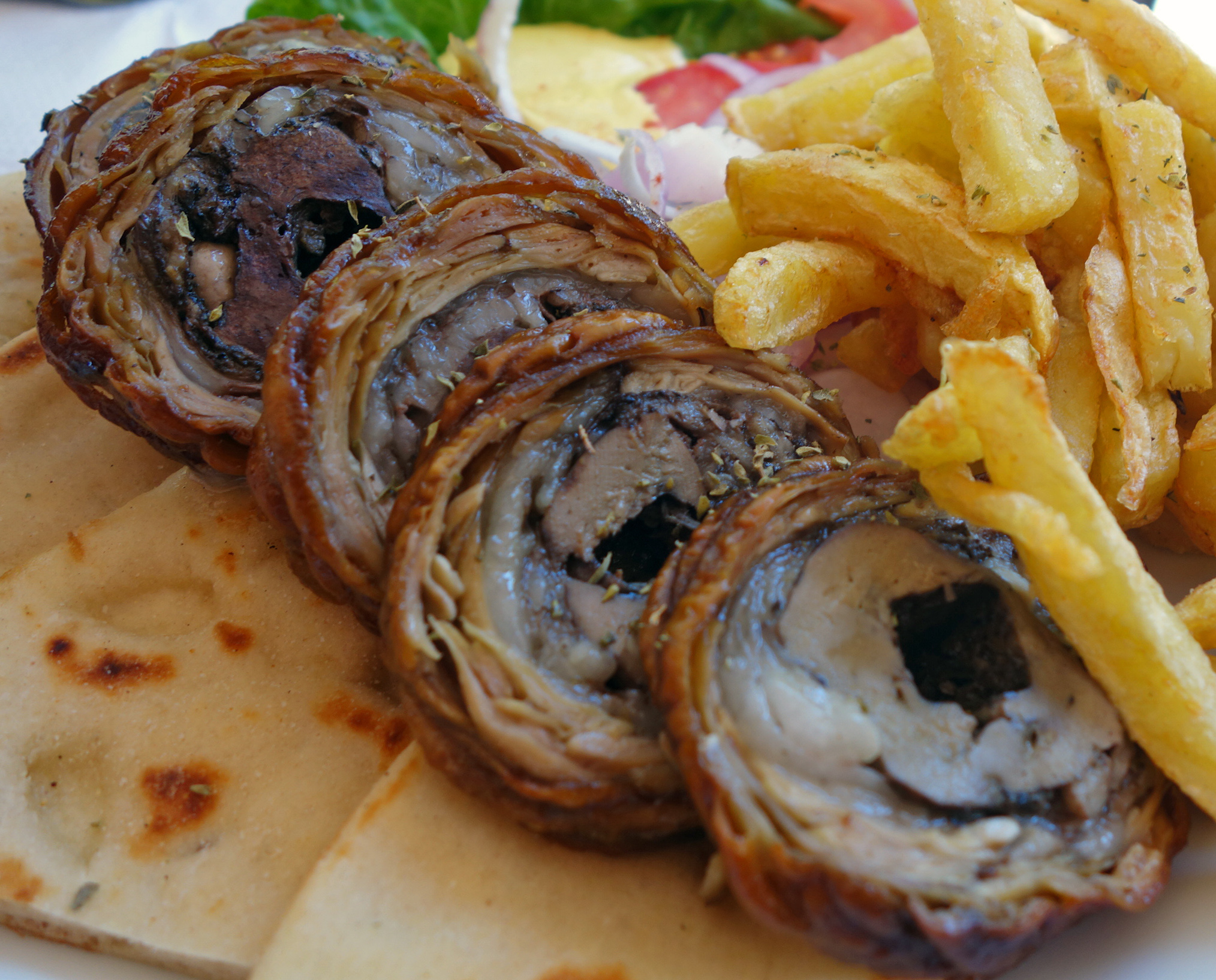
Sliced kokoretsi, served with flatbread and french fries in Ioannina

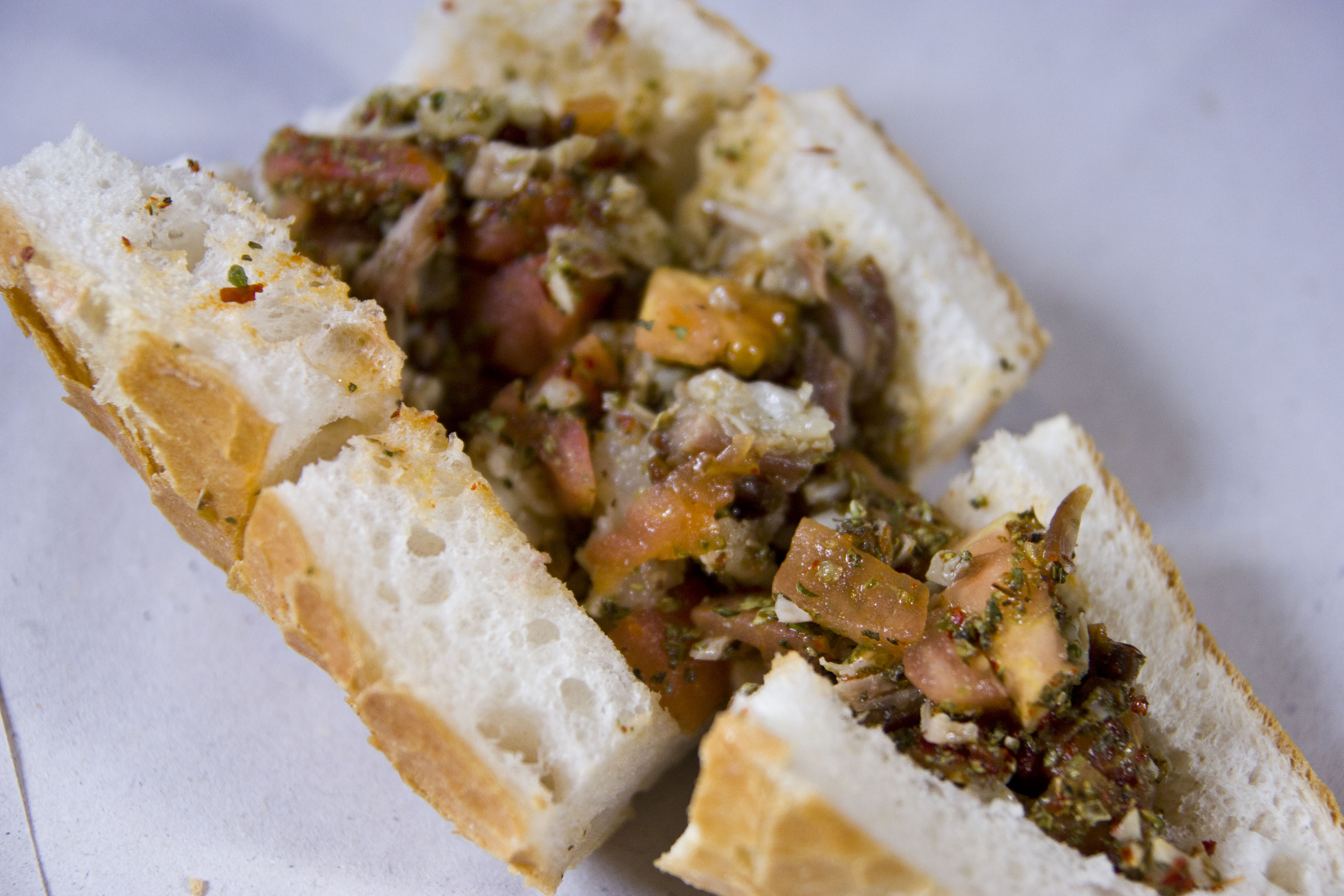
Kokoretsi with tomatoes and spices, served on bread in Eminönü

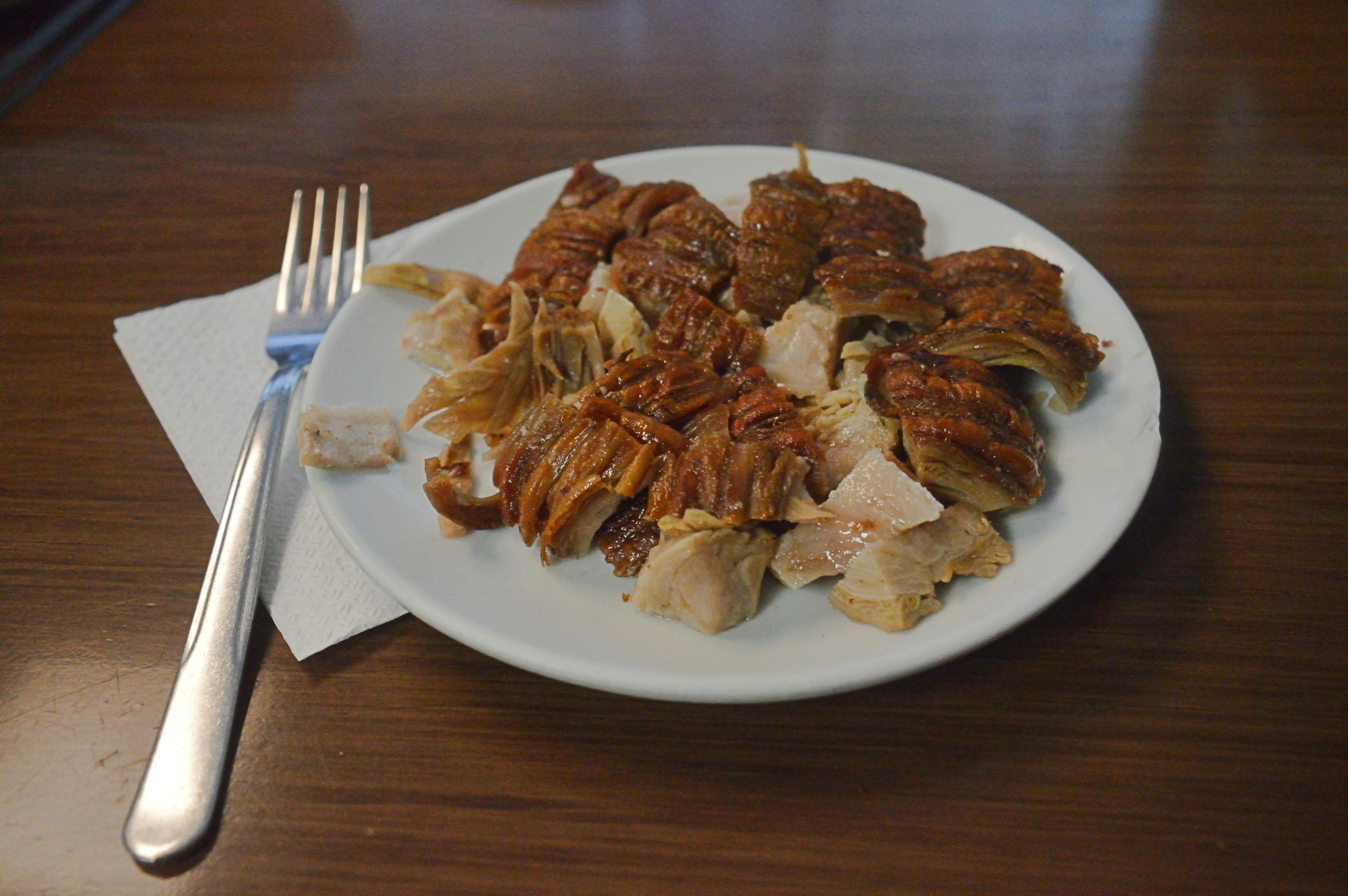
Served on a plate in Balat, Fatih, Istanbul

== National and regional variations ==
=== Byzantine Empire and Greece ===
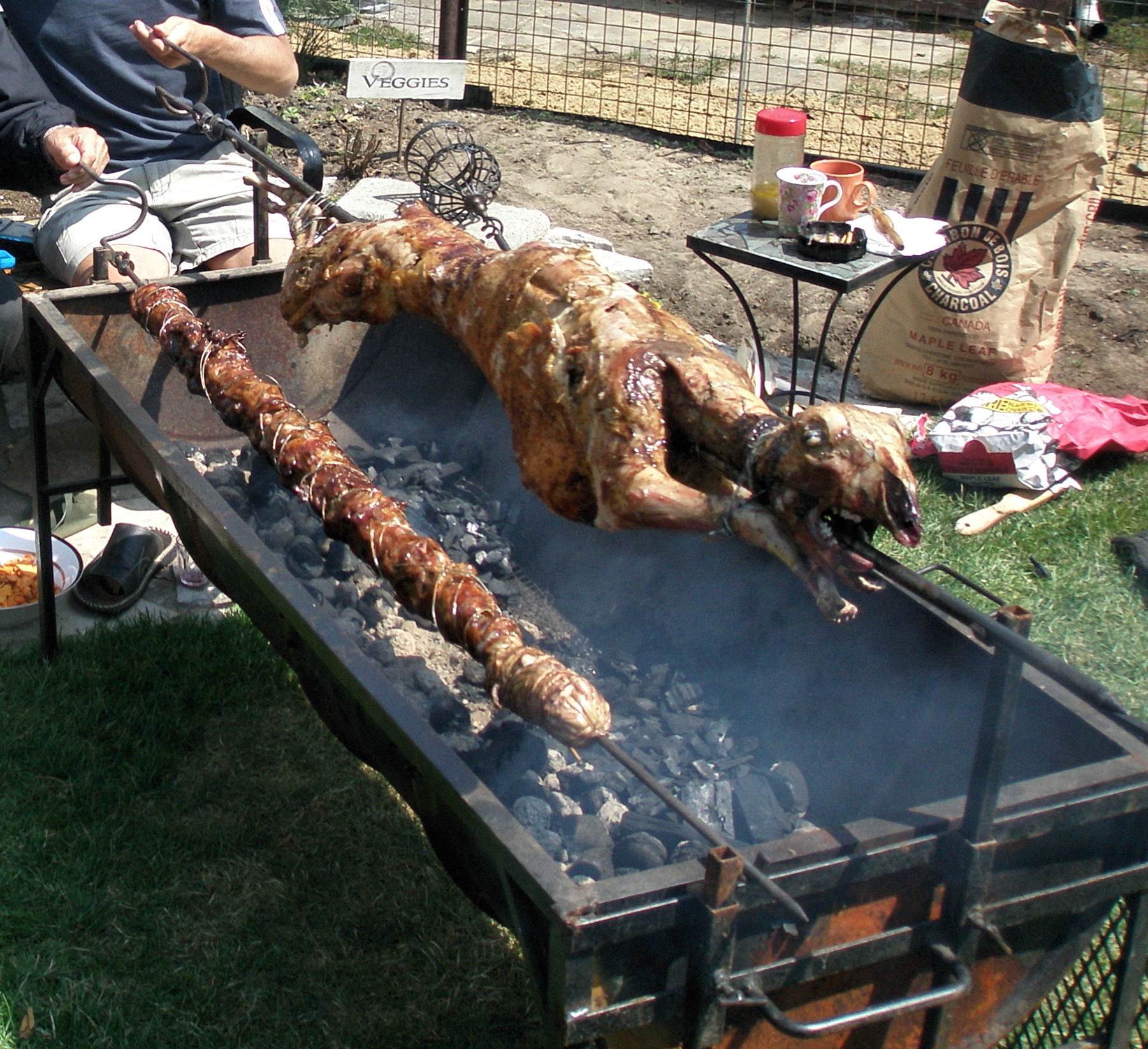
Kokoretsi being roasted with lamb during Greek Orthodox Easter celebrations

The Byzantines treated the small intestines of sheep and goats the same way as modern Greeks do when making kokoretsi. Through a simple process, the intestines were inverted with the help of a small stick in order to be cleaned. They were then wrapped in braids, in the appropriate shape, or around other entrails on a skewer.

In modern times, kokoretsi is traditionally served for Orthodox Easter celebrations; eaten as an appetizer while the lamb (being the main dish) is roasting. It is also served year-round. Gardouba (γαρδούμπα) or gardoubakia (γαρδουμπάκια) is a smaller version of kokoretsi; it may be grilled like kokoretsi, roasted in a pan, or cooked in the oven.

Due to outbreak of mad cow disease in the late '90s, banning the consumption of offal was considered. However, the idea was abandoned.

=== Turkey ===
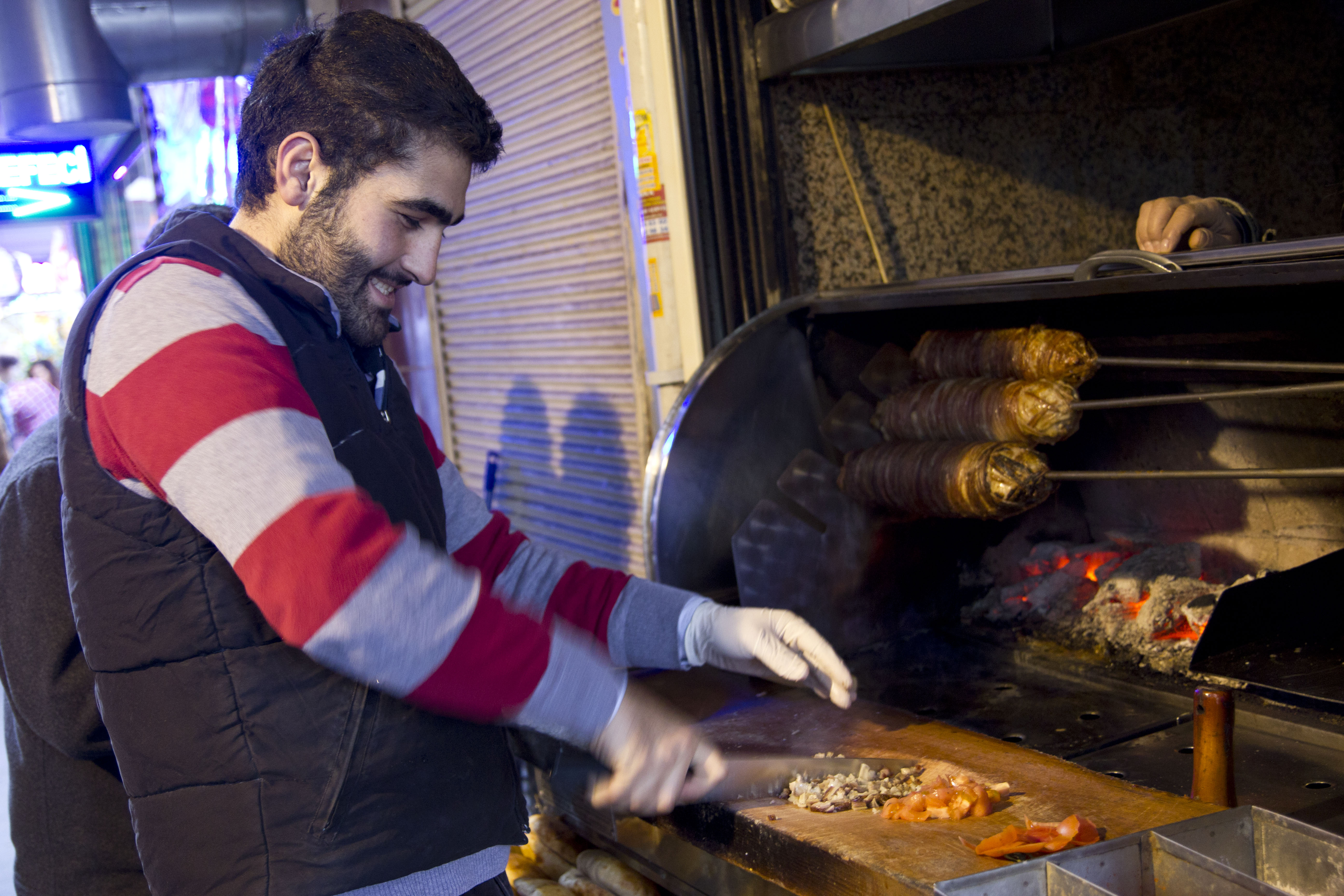
Turkish kokoreççi (kokoretsi maker) in Fatih, İstanbul

Kokoretsi is one of the most consumed fast foods in Turkey, being described as "the signature delight" of the country. Although it is also served in some restaurants, most of the kokoretsi is prepared, cooked and sold in small kiosks year-round, and is usually consumed as a sandwich. Kokoretsi makers are called kokoreççi in Turkish.

In the early 2000s, during the Turkish accession to the European Union it has been speculated by the Turkish media that EU regulations regarding sheep's offal would eventually lead to a ban on kokoretsi, if Turkey ever become a member state.

=== Others ===
The Aromanians also prepare kokoretsi.

== See also ==
- Haggis, a similar dish from the United Kingdom
- List of goat dishes
- List of lamb dishes
- Torcinello, a similar southern Italian dish
- Stigghiola, a similar southern Italian dish
