= Dragotina =

Dragotina may refer to:

- Dragotina, Greece, a village in Greece
- Dragotina, Russia, a village in Pskov Oblast, Russia
- Dragotina, Croatia, a village near Glina
