= Kouspades =

Kouspades Κουσπάδες
- Community
- Location within Greece
- Coordinates: 39°27′N 19°58′E
- Country: Greece
- Administrative region: Ionian Islands
- Regional unit: Corfu
- Municipality: South Corfu
- Municipal unit: Korissia

Population (2021)
  - Community: 310
- Time zone: UTC+2 (EET)
  - Summer (DST): UTC+3 (EEST)
- Vehicle registration: ΚΥ

Kouspades (Greek: Κουσπάδες) is a village and a community in the southern part of the island of Corfu, Greece. It is part of the municipal unit of Korissia. The community includes the beach village Boukaris. Kouspades is located south of the city of Corfu. It is situated in low hills near the coast.

== Population ==
Year	Village population	Community population
1981	-	462
1991	394	426
2001	333	383
2011	295	349
2021	247	310

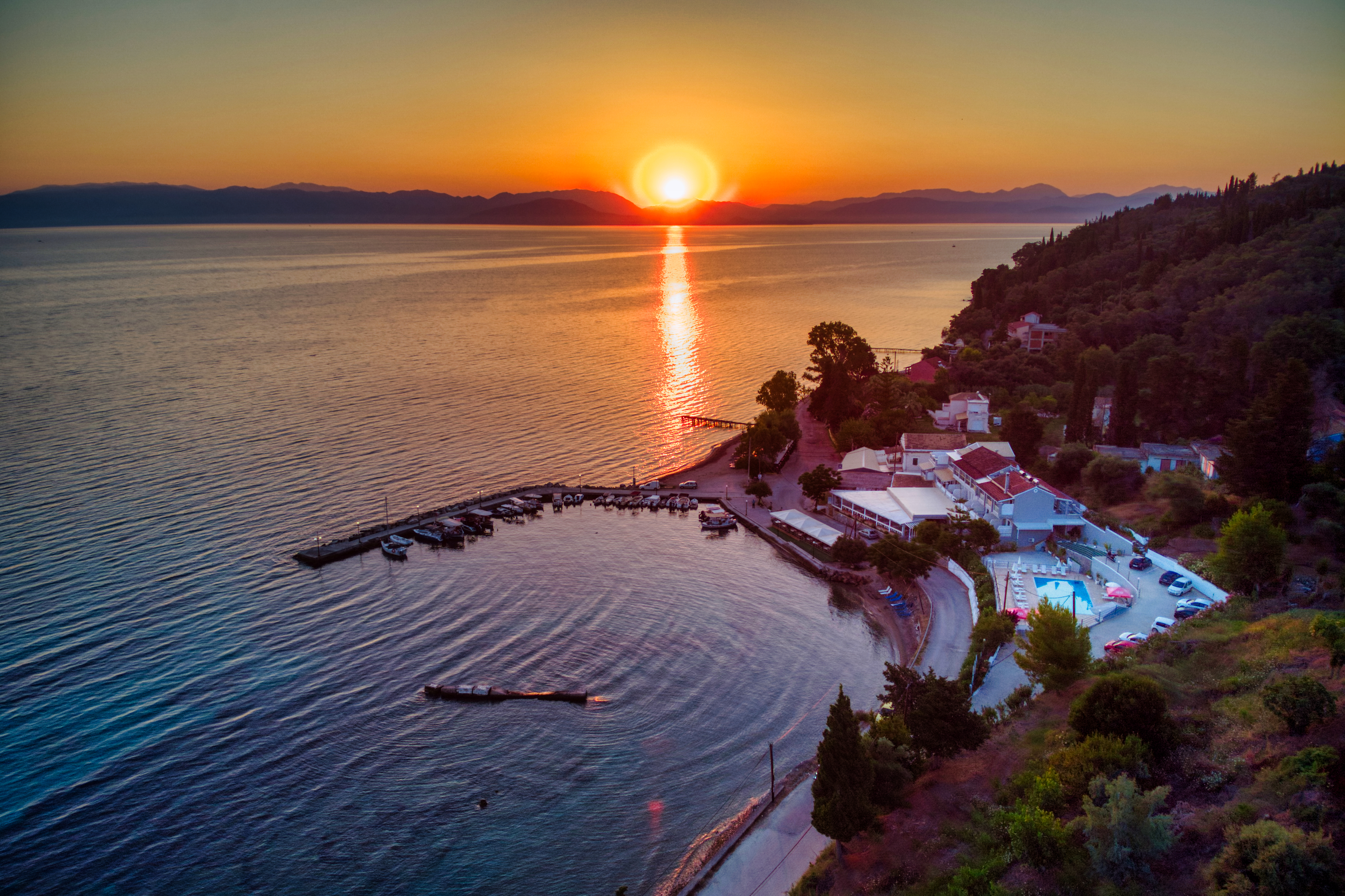
Boukaris- Sunrise

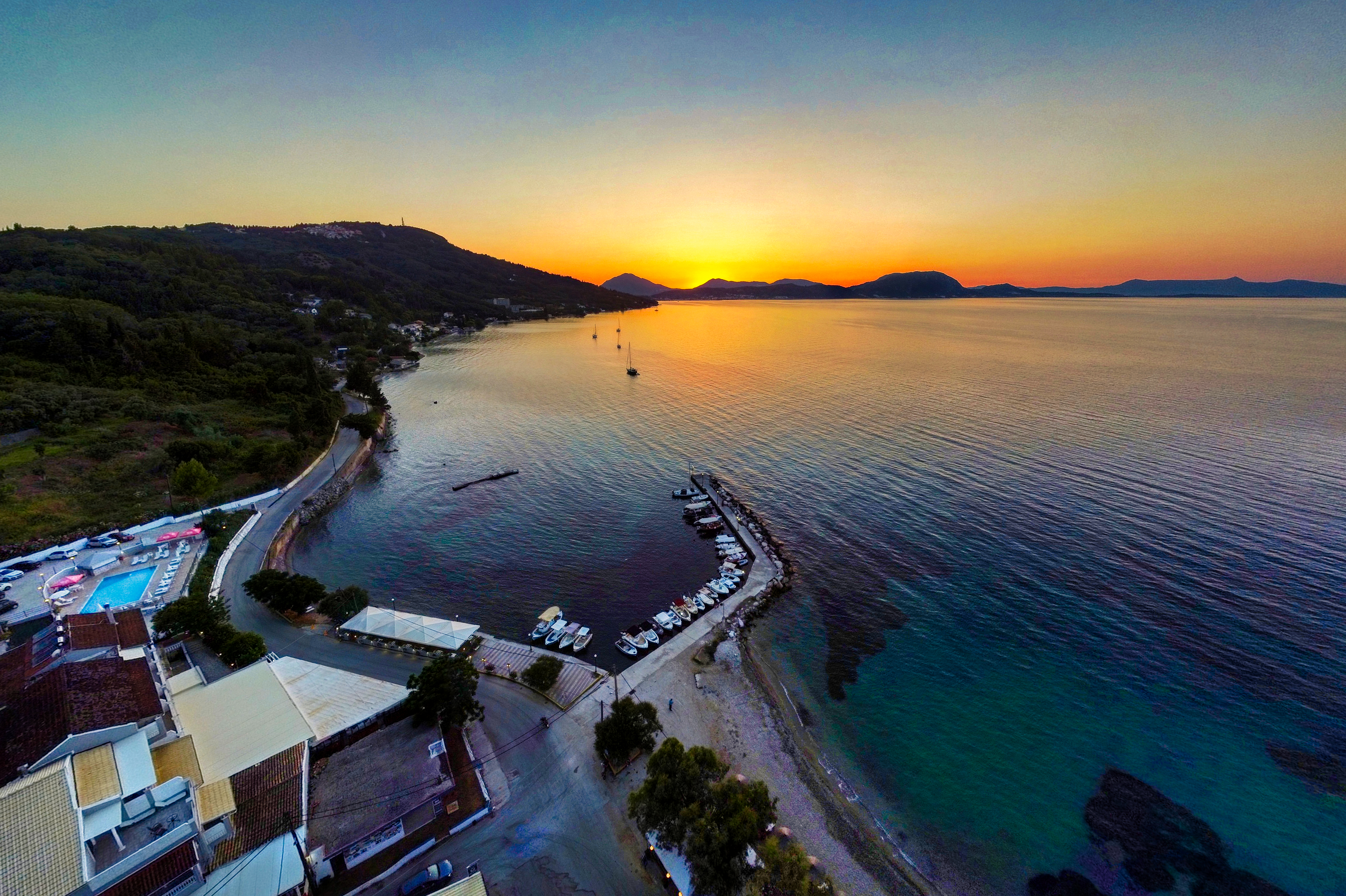
Boukaris- Sunset

== See also ==
- List of settlements in the Corfu regional unit
