= Petriti =

Petriti Πετριτή
- Community
- Location within Greece
- Coordinates: 39°27′N 20°00′E
- Country: Greece
- Administrative region: Ionian Islands
- Regional unit: Corfu
- Municipality: South Corfu
- Municipal unit: Korissia

Population (2021)
  - Community: 635
- Time zone: UTC+2 (EET)
  - Summer (DST): UTC+3 (EEST)

Petriti (Greek: Πετριτή) is a fishing village located on the south east coast of Corfu, Greece, about thirty kilometers south of Corfu Town. The village is the largest fishing port on the island and the five tavernas on the sea front all specialise in seafood. Petriti is also a low-key tourist destination catering for people who prefer relaxing holidays in contrast to some of the busier resorts in Corfu. Petriti is in the municipal unit of Korissia and the community has a population of 635 (2021).
