= Sol, Fest och Oroliga Föräldrar =

Swedish television series

- Title Card of Programme
- Country of origin: Sweden
- No. of series: 1
- No. of episodes: 8

Production
- Running time: 45 mins
- Production company: Zodiak Media Group

Original release
- Network: Kanal 5
- Release: 8 September 2011 – present

Sol, Fest och Oroliga Föräldrar (English translation: Sun, Celebration and Concerned Parents) is the Swedish version of Sun, Sex and Suspicious Parents, a reality/documentary television programme originating in the UK. The basic premise is that teenagers go on holiday under the impression they're being filmed for a stereotypical reality show, without knowing their parents also go to the holiday resort to spy on what their children are doing. The programme has had one series to date, with eight episodes within it.

== Series 1 (2011) ==
Series 1 first aired on Kanal 5 on 8 September 2011, having been filmed throughout the summer season of 2011.

=== Episode 1 ===
The first episode follows traveling buddies Catrin, Isabella and Emma on an unforgettable holiday to Ayia Napa. There is sunbathing and crazy party nights. But what they do not know is that Catrin's mother and stepfather go on the trip and testify to everything. Originally Aired: 8 September 2011.

=== Episode 2 ===
Episode 2 features 18-year-old Ronja from Gothenburg who goes with her friends Erika and Caroline on holiday, unaware of the presence of her parents Jennie and Magnus. 19-year-old Nicklas from Sala also goes with his friends Robin, Kevin and Williamson as both groups have a real, unforgettable party holiday in the sun. Originally aired: 15 September 2011.

=== Episode 3 ===
Jannie, 19, goes on vacation without hard-rock parents Ian and Marita Haugland and it becomes a road trip. Meanwhile, Christopher, 19, from Lidingö travels with stepbrother Sebastian and his friend Martin to the sun. But mum Elisabeth is much closer than the guys think. Originally aired: 22 September 2011.

=== Episode 4 ===
20-year-old Johnny, Calvin and Kevin go to a week of celebration and adventure, but mum Sandra is worried about Johnny's allergies. For Cassandra who's with friends Filippa, Isabell and Josephine - it's all about the party and Cassandra's mother Nina is not completely happy. Originally aired: 29 September 2011.

=== Episode 5 ===
Nacho and his friends unleash themselves on the holiday resort, but mum and dad do as well - though are well hidden from the guys. Whilst 19-year-old Amanda travels with friends and her parents witness her heavy drinking of drams of race and see her events on a party cruise. Originally aired: 6 October 2011.

=== Episode 6 ===
Fun-loving girls Fanny, Isabelle and Sarah are on holiday to party, swim and meet exotic men. They seem however to have forgotten what they promised their parents before they left. Originally aired: 13 October 2011.

=== Episode 7 ===
19-year-old Majid from Lerum goes on holiday with friends Humberto and Jacob in an attempt to chill out and party. Little did he know that Mum Marianne and Aunt Ann-Sofie were to come after him and spy on his holiday. Also, we see Malin from Norrköping, who is with his friends Rebecca, Mary and Jennie hoping for sun, adventure and celebration. But parents Michael and Marie sneak up on them like they'd never have imagined. Originally aired on 20 October 2011.

=== Episode 8 ===
In the finale of the series, 18-year-old Dennis and her friends Ibbe, Richard and Sebastian and Robert and his friends Ahnaf, David and Jonas travel to Magaluf for an adventurous and alcoholic holiday. It's definitely a week where the teens are in search of sleep. Originally aired on 27 October 2011.
