= Agios Nikolaos, Corfu =

Agios Nikolaos Άγιος Νικόλαος
- Community
- Location within Greece
- Coordinates: 39°26′N 20°00′E
- Country: Greece
- Administrative region: Ionian Islands
- Regional unit: Corfu
- Municipality: South Corfu
- Municipal unit: Korissia

Population (2021)
  - Community: 436
- Time zone: UTC+2 (EET)
  - Summer (DST): UTC+3 (EEST)
- Vehicle registration: ΚΥ

Agios Nikolaos (Greek: Άγιος Νικόλαος, before 1940: Κολοκύθι - Kolokythi, meaning "courgette") is a traditional quiet village in the south-east of Corfu near to the villages of Petriti and Notos. The main industry is agriculture as the land around is flat and the soil is rich despite the main part of the village being situated on a hill. There is a little tourism, mainly people who want to keep clear of large resorts. There are very few old houses in the village; most were built relatively recently, giving the place a more affluent feel than most Corfiot Villages. The villagers came down from the old village of Korakades following a landslide which washed most of the village away.
