= Dragotina, Greece =

Village in the southern part of Corfu, Greece

Coordinates: 39°23′N 20°5′E

Dragotina (Greek: Δραγωτινά) is a village in the southern part of the island of Corfu. It is located in the community of Neochori and the municipal unit of Lefkimmi. Dragotina is located east-southeast of the city of Corfu.

It is located between Neochori and Spartera, 50 metres above the sea level. This is a village invisible from the sea in order to be protected from the intruders in the past. It is first mentioned in 1473. Dragotina was named after the surname Dragotis or Draotis, or even Draonis. This is one version of the story, the other is that it was named after the village Dragoti in Thesprotia, from a place where a great number of people had to move to Corfu. According to a different notion the village's name means ‘dragatis’ translated as rural police. A final version is the Slav name Dragotino. The village used to be near Spartera at the foot of Taxiarchis hill towards the lower Klismata. In the area the sandy beach Kanoula is found.

Famous surnames of the 16th century are Vlachopoulos, Grantos in 1507, Vamvakas, Gardikiotis, Therianos, Kontomaris, Mihalitzis, Vlassis, Melahrinos, Smoilis, and Arvanitis.

== Population ==
In a census in 1583 there is a reference of the village but no reference of residents. In 1684 the village consisted of 10 families; in 1781 there were 42 residents; in 1879 there were 102 residents.

Historical population
Year	Pop.	±%
1991	293	—
2001	266	−9.2%
2011	249	−6.4%

== See also ==
- List of settlements in the Corfu prefecture
