= Jean Baptiste Hippolyte Dance =

French pathologist (1797–1832)

Jean Baptiste Hippolyte Dance (22 February 1797, in Saint-Pal-de-Chalencon – 18 April 1832, Paris) was a French pathologist who first described Dance's sign. He was the son of a physician and studied medicine in Paris, gaining his M.D. in 1826. He was physician to the Hôpital Cochin and had just been employed to teach at the clinic of l'Hôtel-Dieu when he died of cholera, aged 35. He left a number of publications, including those describing his eponymous sign and an early description of the parathyroid tetany which occurs in hypoparathyroidism.
