= Enteric duplication cyst =

Rare congenital malformations of the gastrointestinal tract

Enteric duplication cysts, sometimes simply called duplication cysts, are rare congenital malformations of the gastrointestinal tract. They most frequently occur in the small intestine, particularly the ileum, but can occur anywhere along the gastrointestinal tract. They may be cystic or tubular in conformation.

The condition of having duplication cysts has been called intestinal duplication.

== Symptoms and signs ==
Symptoms depend on the location of the duplication. Duplications occurring high in the gastrointestinal tract (e.g. esophageal) may cause difficulty breathing due to compression of the airway. Lower gastrointestinal duplications (e.g. duodenum, colon) can be associated with abdominal pain, gastrointestinal bleeding, a palpable mass, vomiting, or may cause bowel obstruction. Smaller lesions can act as a so-called "lead point" for intussusception.

== Treatment ==
Duplications are usually removed surgically, even if they are found incidentally (i.e. not causing symptoms or encountered on routine studies for other reasons), as there is a high incidence of complications resulting from untreated cases. Cysts are often technically easier to remove than tubular malformations since tubular structures usually share a blood supply with the associated gut.
