= Dance's sign =

Clinical sign indicating intussusception

Dance's sign is an eponymous medical sign first described by the French pathologist Jean Baptiste Hippolyte Dance, requiring investigation of the right lower quadrant of the abdomen for retraction of the right iliac fossa, which can indicate an intussusception.
