= Meliteieis =

Meliteieis Μελιτειείς
- Municipal unit
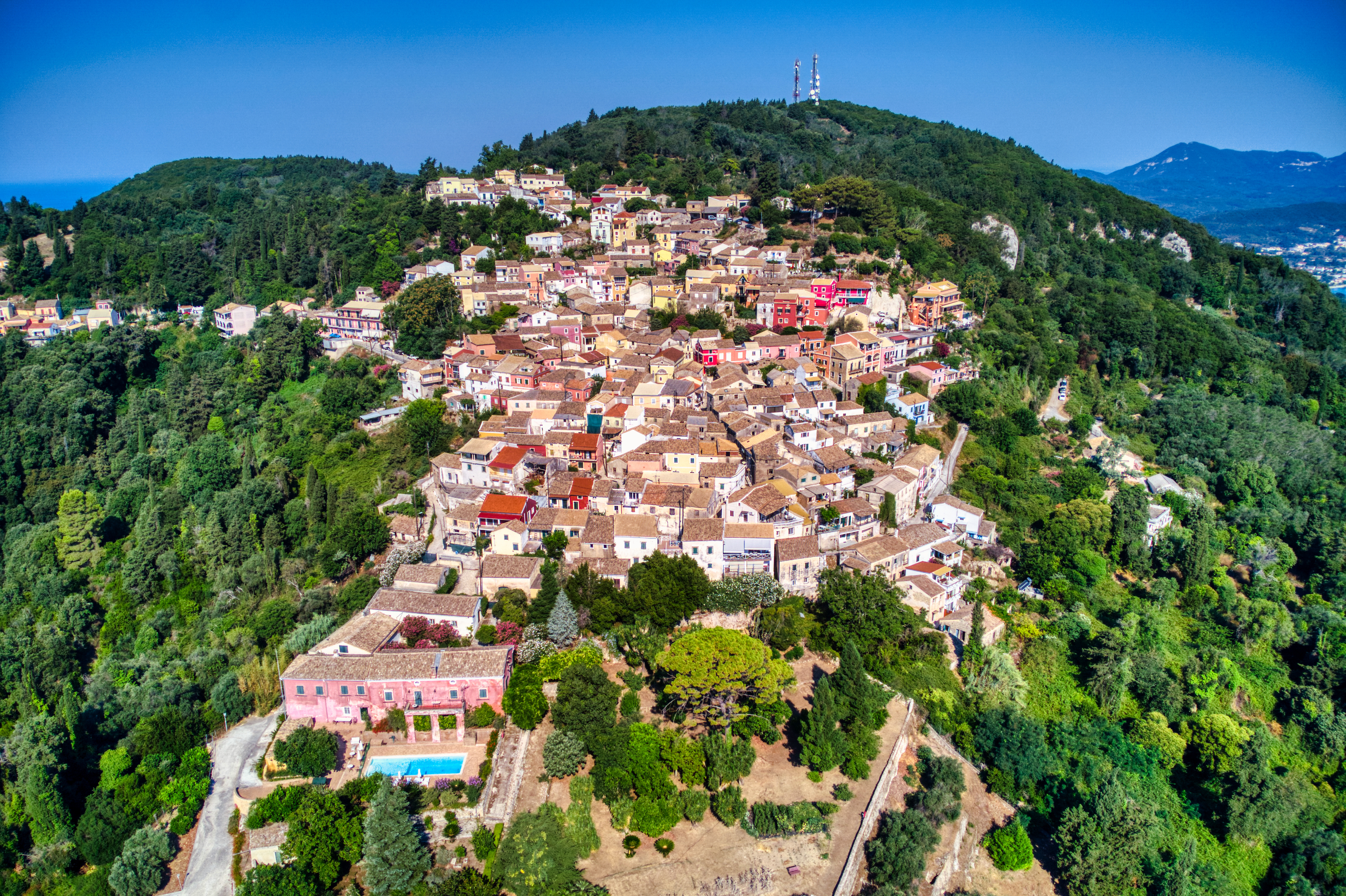
- Chlomos

- Location within the regional unit

- Location within Greece
- Coordinates: 39°29′N 19°54′E
- Country: Greece
- Administrative region: Ionian Islands
- Regional unit: Corfu
- Municipality: South Corfu

Area
  - Municipal unit: 67.1 km^{2} (25.9 sq mi)

Population (2021)
  - Municipal unit: 4,733
  - Municipal unit density: 70.5/km^{2} (183/sq mi)
- Time zone: UTC+2 (EET)
  - Summer (DST): UTC+3 (EEST)
- Vehicle registration: ΚΥ

Meliteieis (Greek: Μελιτειείς) is a former municipality on the island of Corfu, Ionian Islands, Greece. Since the 2019 local government reform it is part of the municipality South Corfu, of which it is a municipal unit. It is located in the southern part of the island of Corfu. It has a land area of 67.054 km² and a population of 4,733 inhabitants (2021 census). The seat of the municipality was the town of Moraitika. The municipal unit consists of the communities Agios Matthaios, Ano Pavliana, Chlomatiana, Chlomos, Kato Pavliana, Moraitika, Pentati, Strongyli and Vouniatades.
