= Kavos =

Place in Corfu, Greece

Kavos Κάβος
- Settlement
- Location within Greece
- Coordinates: 39°23′N 20°07′E
- Country: Greece
- Administrative region: Ionian Islands
- Regional unit: Corfu
- Municipality: South Corfu
- Municipal unit: Lefkimmi
- Community: Lefkimmi

Population (2021)
  - Total: 643
- Time zone: UTC+2 (EET)
  - Summer (DST): UTC+3 (EEST)
- Vehicle registration: ΚΥ

Kavos (Greek: Κάβος) is the southernmost seaside village on the island of Corfu in Greece, in the municipal unit of Lefkimmi. Since the early post-war era, it has gained popularity as a resort heavily devoted to tourism and is popular with young (Club 18–30) holidaymakers from Britain, Germany, Serbia and Northern Europe.

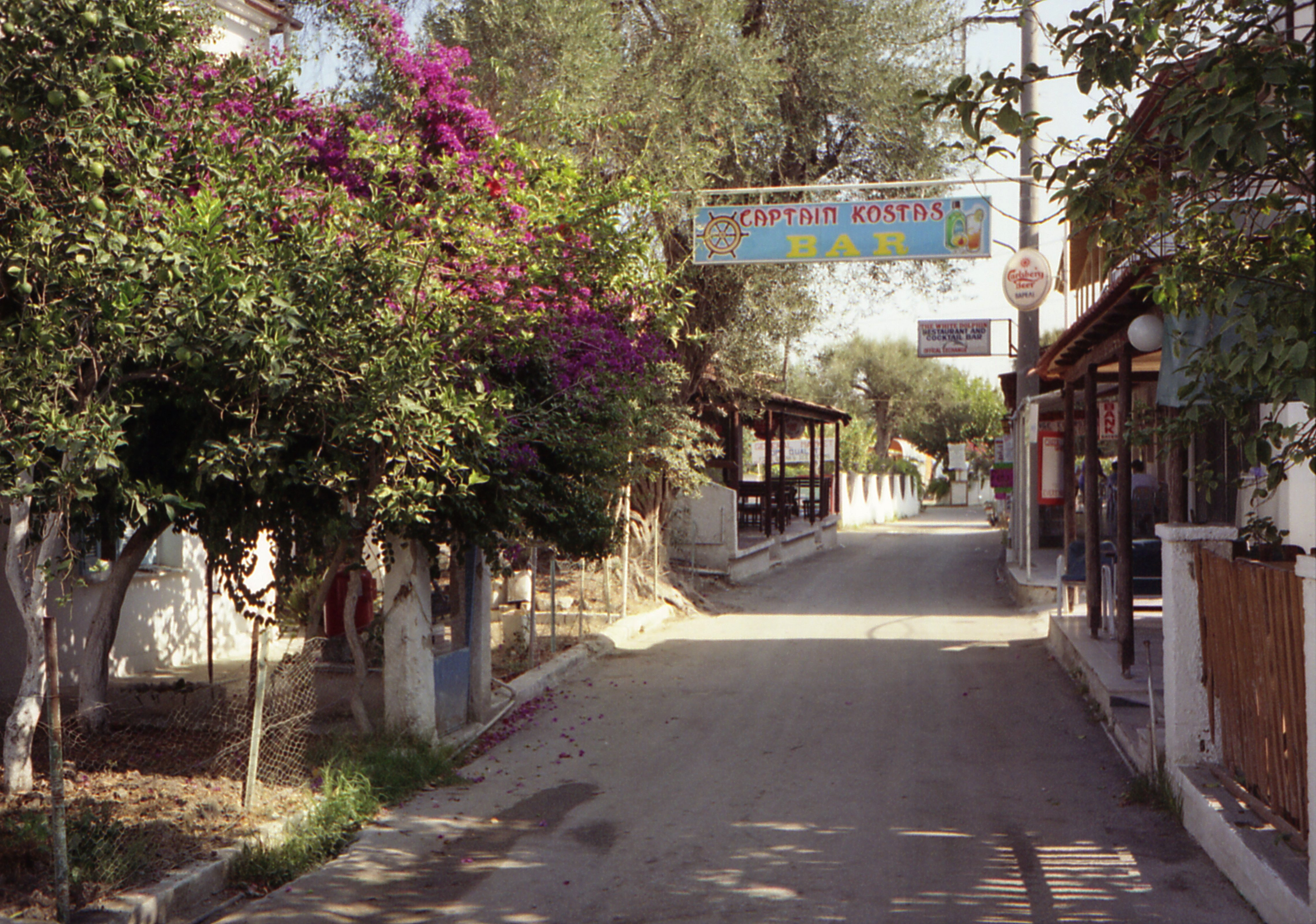
Kavos in 1990

The main part of Kavos is the long strip which runs parallel to the coast line, which contains a large proportion of the restaurants, shops, hotels and apartments.
