= Sun, Sex and Suspicious Parents =

British television series

- Narrated by: Russell Tovey
- Country of origin: United Kingdom
- Original language: English
- No. of series: 5
- No. of episodes: 31

Production
- Executive producers: Calum Cassidy (S1); Tayte Simpson (S1–2); Jo Scarratt-Jones (S2-4)
- Producers: Angela Norris (S1); Zoe Page (S2); Jon Lloyd (S3); Blake McGrow (S4)
- Running time: 60 minutes
- Production company: RDF Television

Original release
- Network: BBC Three; BBC Three HD (2014–16)
- Release: 4 January 2011 – 8 July 2015

Related
- Snow, Sex and Suspicious Parents; Festivals, Sex and Suspicious Parents

Sun, Sex and Suspicious Parents is a British documentary/reality television series aired on BBC Three from 4 January 2011 – 8 July 2015.

== Concept ==
People in their late teens and early twenties go on their first girls'/lads' holiday abroad under the belief that they are getting away from their parents. However, their parents are also sent to the holiday destination and secretly watch footage of their children on video screens and also spy in their hotel rooms and at nightclub locations. The parents then reveal themselves on the last night of the holiday, to the dismay of the children, and tell them what they've seen and learned.

=== Viewing figures ===
The 2012 series regularly hit high viewing figures for a digital television programme. The Ayia Napa episode was the "most watched multichannels show" of 15 February 2012 with 1.26 million viewers, beating The Only Way Is Essex. The Malia episode had 899,000 viewers whilst the Ibiza episode was reportedly the most watched programme of the series, with 1.42 million viewers according to BARB.

On BBC Three in the UK, Sun, Sex and Suspicious Parents was the number one unscripted show of 2012, doubling the slot average and was also the most requested show on the BBC iPlayer catch-up service during February 2012.

=== Press reviews ===
The programme has been met with many national reviews. The Metro called the programme "brilliantly tacky" and said it's enough to make people "practically wet themselves with excitement". However, not all reviews were so light-hearted with The Guardian calling it "one to miss" and The Independent saying it's "one of BBC3's more obnoxious offerings".

== Transmissions ==
Series	Season	Episodes	Originally released	
Series	Season	Episodes	First released	Last released
Sun, Sex and Suspicious Parents	1	7	4 January 2011	10 February 2011
Sun, Sex and Suspicious Parents	2	7	25 January 2012	7 March 2012
Sun, Sex and Suspicious Parents	3	8	8 January 2013	26 February 2013
Sun, Sex and Suspicious Parents	4	7	13 January 2014	23 February 2014
Sun, Sex and Suspicious Parents	5	2	30 June 2015	8 July 2015
Snow, Sex and Suspicious Parents	1	4	12 November 2013	10 December 2013
Snow, Sex and Suspicious Parents	2	4	28 October 2014	18 November 2014
Festivals, Sex and Suspicious Parents	1	2	26 February 2014	5 March 2014
Festivals, Sex and Suspicious Parents	2	4	26 May 2015	9 June 2015
Freshers, Sex and Suspicious Parents	1	1	23 June 2015	

== Episodes ==
Episode viewing figures are provided by BARB.

=== Series 1 (2011) ===
Series 1 first aired on BBC Three on 4 January 2011, having been filmed throughout the summer season of 2010.

No. in series	Holiday location	Original release date	Viewing figures
1	Malia, Crete	4 January 2011	883,000
2	Ibiza	11 January 2011	834,000
3	Ayia Napa	18 January 2011	Under 638,000
4	Kavos	25 January 2011	Under 745,000
5	Zante	1 February 2011	804,000
6	Magaluf	8 February 2011	881,000
7	After the Holiday	10 February 2011	Under 735,000

=== Series 2 (2012) ===
Series 2 premiered on BBC Three on 25 January 2012 having been filmed throughout the summer season of 2011. The series consists of seven episodes.

No. in series	Holiday location	Original release date	Viewing figures
1	Kos	25 January 2012	Under 703,000
2	Malia	1 February 2012	899,000
3	Kavos	8 February 2012	1,094,000
4	Ayia Napa	15 February 2012	1,261,000
5	Ibiza	22 February 2012	1,421,000
6	Zante	29 February 2012	1,051,000
7	After the Holiday	7 March 2012	764,000

=== Series 3 (2013) ===
The BBC began recruiting for a new series called The Big Vacation during 2012.

This was later confirmed to be the third series of Sun, Sex and Suspicious Parents, consisting of eight episodes. The series began on 8 January 2013 at 9pm, include seven holiday episodes and one recap episode which will include the best participants from the series. The BBC confirmed these reports on 4 December 2012 when they advertised new programmes being introduced to the channel, which included a short clip from the new series of Sun, Sex and Suspicious Parents.

No. in series	Holiday location	Original release date	Viewing figures
1	Magaluf	8 January 2013	972,000
Jemma, 19, from Burnley and Ashley, 18, from Cardiff head to Magaluf, Majorca.
2	Malia	15 January 2013	1,130,000
Dale from Manchester and Tom from Stoke-On-Trent head for a week in Malia, Crete.
3	Zante	22 January 2013	1,045,000
Kieran, 18, from Norwich and Natasha from Southend-on-Sea head for a week in Zante.
4	Kos	29 January 2013	965,000
Mummy's girl Charli, 18 and Max, 18 from Kent go for a week's partying on the Greek island of Kos.
5	Zante	5 February 2013	1,272,000
Two 18-year-old boys; builder Phil from Liverpool and openly gay Cian from Cheltenham, who have completely different lives, head off to the Greek party island of Zante.
6	Kavos	12 February 2013	1,036,000
Two 19-year-olds; Ollie who lives in Bath and Katy who lives in Basildon head off for week in Kavos.
7	Ayia Napa	19 February 2013	1,013,000
Londoner Ashleigh and Tom, from Bolton head off to the clubbing capital of Cyprus, Ayia Napa.
8	After the Holiday	26 February 2013	Under 600,000
A look back at the third series, in this episode, the parents and the teens talk about their experiences on the show and what happened after.

=== Series 4: Thailand (2014) ===
Series four began on 13 January 2014 and branches out beyond Europe for the first time. It features individuals travelling to Thailand, who were told that they were being filmed for a show called Thailand Style.

No. in series	Holiday location	Original release date	Viewing figures
1	Koh Samui	13 January 2014	Under 637,000
Alex, 20, from Huddersfield & Josh, 22, from Kent
2	Koh Phangan	21 January 2014	Under 614,000
Pat from Essex & Daniel from Sussex
3	Koh Phangan	28 January 2014	Under 658,000
Callum, 20, Leicester & Lindon, 21, Peterborough.
4	Koh Phi Phi	4 February 2014	746,000
Chiara, 22, Croydon & Josh, 20, East Grinstead
5	Phuket	11 February 2014	Under 657,000
Jo, Bristol & John, Newcastle
6	Koh Samui	18 February 2014	660,000
Agi, 22, Essex & Billy, 21, Bristol
7	After the Holiday	23 February 2014	Under 660,000
A look back at the fourth series, in this episode, the parents and the teens talk about their experiences on the show and what happened after.

=== Series 5 (2015) ===
The fifth series of Sun, Sex and Suspicious Parents started airing on 30 June 2015 on BBC3 and consisted of two episodes.

No. in series	Location	Original release date	Viewing figures
1	Bulgaria	30 June 2015	N/A
Kirsty, 24, and Chloe, 19, head to Bulgaria's most popular resort; Sunny Beach.
2	Malia	7 July 2015	N/A

== Snow, Sex and Suspicious Parents ==
Snow, Sex and Suspicious Parents
- Narrated by: Russell Tovey
- Country of origin: United Kingdom
- Original language: English
- No. of series: 2
- No. of episodes: 8

Production
- Executive producers: Jo Scarratt-Jones (S1-2); Denise Seneviratne (S2)
- Producers: Romy Page (S1); Vivienne Molokwu (S2 Ep.1); Will Innes (S2 Ep.2); Keeley van Dyke(S2 Ep.3)
- Running time: 60 mins
- Production company: RDF Television

Original release
- Network: BBC Three; BBC Three HD (2014–)
- Release: 12 November 2013 – 18 November 2014

=== Series 1 ===
In addition to recommissioning series four, a spin-off series was commissioned for late 2013. The first series, consisting of four episodes, began in November 2013.

No. in series	Holiday location	Original release date	Viewing figures
1	Val-d'Isère, France	12 November 2013	865,000
Olly and Jake head to the French Alps for fun and games, with their mums watching on.
2	Val-d'Isère	19 November 2013	Under 764,000
Chase and Ben head to the French Alps with their parents expecting exemplary behaviour.
3	Tignes	26 November 2013	812,000
Max from Hemel Hempstead and Daryl from Manchester are set to party hard in Tignes.
4	After the Holiday	10 December 2013	Under 647,000
The six skiers reveal what happened after the older generation came out of their hiding places, and are given the chance to see their parents' reactions to their behaviour during the spying mission.

=== Series 2 ===
No. in series	Holiday location	Original release date	Viewing figures
1	Méribel	28 October 2014	Under 529,000
Jack from Kent and Dan from Manchester head off for a skiing holiday in the French Alps.
2	Sauze d'Oulx	4 November 2014	TBA
Laura from Warrington and Louis from Preston head off for a skiing holiday in Italy.
3	Val d'Isere	11 November 2014	TBA
Twins Connor and Daniel from Scotland and Adam from Leeds head off for a skiing holiday in the French Alps.
4	After the Holiday	18 November 2014	TBA

== Festivals, Sex and Suspicious Parents ==
Festivals, Sex and Suspicious Parents
- Narrated by: Russell Tovey
- Country of origin: United Kingdom
- Original language: English
- No. of series: 2
- No. of episodes: 5

Production
- Executive producers: Catherine Welton; Denise Seneviratne; Jo Scarratt-Jones
- Producers: Blake McGrow; Sarah Ladbury
- Running time: 60 mins
- Production company: RDF Television

Original release
- Network: BBC Three
- Release: 26 February 2014 – 6 September 2015

Series one began airing on 26 February 2014, which featured individuals travelling to music festivals within the UK. The second series began to air 26 May 2015 on BBC Three, this series saw groups of young adults heading to music festivals abroad.

=== Series 1 ===
No. in series	Location	Original release date	Viewing figures
1	Kendal Calling	26 February 2014	Under 597,000
Lauren and Chris both visit Kendal Calling Festival.
2	Sundown	5 March 2014	Under 633,000
Harry and Hannah head to Sundown in Norfolk.

=== Series 2 ===
No. in series	Location	Original release date	Viewing figures
1	Frequency Festival	26 May 2015	TBA
Amy, 18, and Charlie, 19, both head to Austria for the Frequency Festival.
2	Shrewsbury Fields Forever Festival	2 June 2015	TBA
Identical twins Scott and Aaron, 22, and Josh, 23, head to Shrewsbury for the Shrewsbury Fields Forever Festival.
3	Sundown Festival	9 June 2015	TBA
Mark and Connah, 19, head to Norfolk for the Sundown Festival.

== Freshers, Sex and Suspicious Parents ==
No. in series	Location	Original release date	Viewing figures
1	Freshers' Week	23 June 2015	N/A
Cleo and Joe head off to Freshers' week in Sheffield.

== Other broadcasts ==
Portugal saw its own version in 2013, Sol, Sexo e Pais a Assistir, and as of June 2016 repeats of the show air on 4Music.
