= Argyrades =

Argyrades Αργυράδες
- Community
- Location within Greece
- Coordinates: 39°26′N 19°58′E
- Country: Greece
- Administrative region: Ionian Islands
- Regional unit: Corfu
- Municipality: South Corfu
- Municipal unit: Korissia

Population (2021)
  - Community: 1,555
- Time zone: UTC+2 (EET)
  - Summer (DST): UTC+3 (EEST)
- Vehicle registration: ΚΥ

Argyrades (Greek: Αργυράδες) is a village and a community in the southern part of the island of Corfu, Greece. It was the seat of the municipality of Korissia. The community includes the villages Agios Georgios, Marathias and Neochoraki. Argyrades is situated in low hills, 4 km east of the Korissia Lagoon. It is 4 km northwest of Perivoli, 8 km west of Lefkimmi and 22 km south of the city of Corfu. The Greek National Road 25 (Corfu - Lefkimmi) passes through the village.

== Population ==
Year	Settlement population	Community population
1981	-	1,648
1991	820	-
2001	1,000	2,033
2011	660	1,719
2021	601	1,555

== See also ==
- List of settlements in the Corfu regional unit
