= Neochori, Corfu =

Neochori Νεοχώρι
- Community
- Location within Greece
- Coordinates: 39°23′N 20°05′E
- Country: Greece
- Administrative region: Ionian Islands
- Regional unit: Corfu
- Municipality: South Corfu
- Municipal unit: Lefkimmi

Population (2021)
  - Community: 1,421
- Time zone: UTC+2 (EET)
  - Summer (DST): UTC+3 (EEST)
- Vehicle registration: ΚΥ

Neochori (Greek: Νεοχώρι meaning "new village") is a village and a community in the southeastern part of the island of Corfu, Greece. It is located in the municipal unit of Lefkimmi. It is situated between low hills.

== Settlements ==
The community Neochori consists of the following villages (populations at the 2021 census):

- Neochori, pop. 252
- Dragotina, pop. 251
- Kritika, pop. 409, founded in the 16th century by refugees from Crete who escaped Ottoman invasion
- Palaiochori, pop. 428
- Spartera, pop. 81

== Population ==
Year	Settlement population	Community population
1981	-	1,641
1991	271	-
2001	232	1,663
2011	182	1,443
2021	252	1,421

== See also ==
- List of settlements in the Corfu regional unit
