= Intussusception (medical disorder) =

Folding of part of the intestine into itself

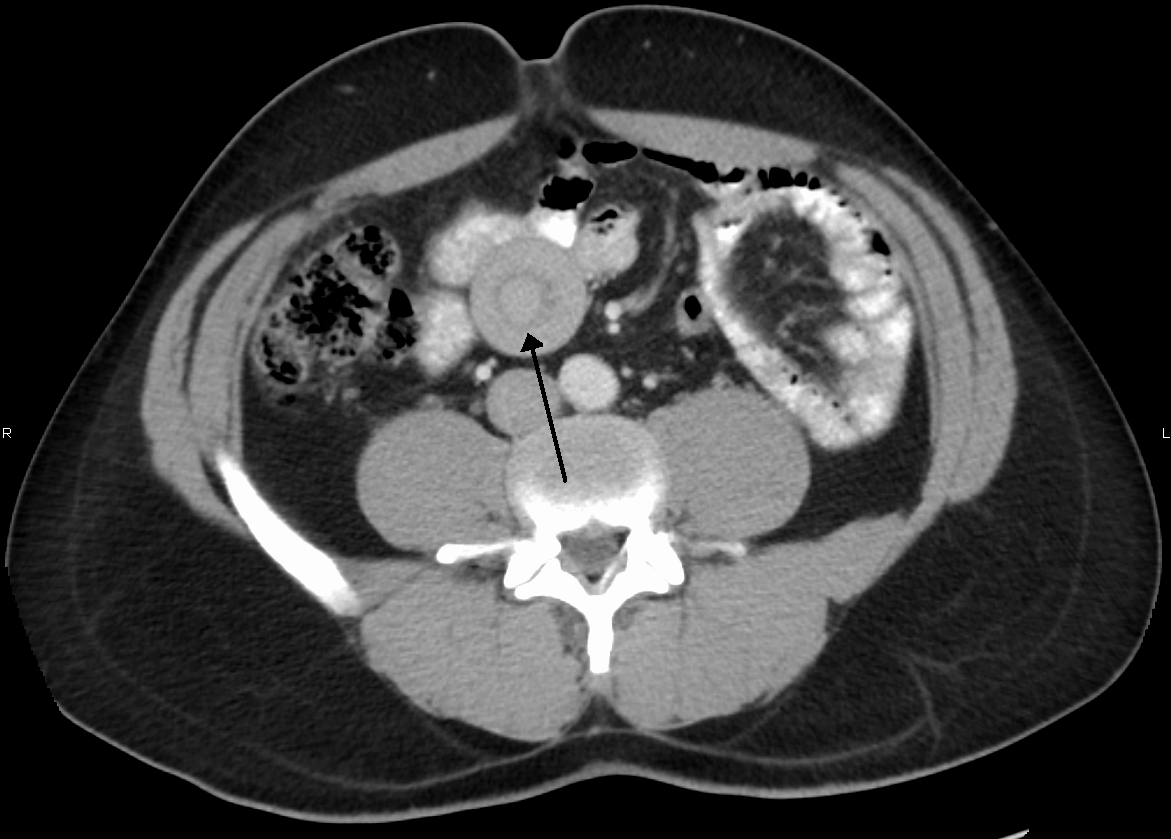
- An intussusception as seen on CT
- Specialty: Gastroenterology, pediatrics, general surgery
- Symptoms: Abdominal pain, vomiting, bloody stool
- Complications: Peritonitis, bowel perforation
- Usual onset: Over days to weeks in a 6- to 18-month-old
- Causes: Unknown, lead point
- Diagnostic method: Medical imaging
- Differential diagnosis: Pyloric stenosis
- Treatment: Enema, surgery
- Medication: Dexamethasone

Intussusception is a medical condition in which a part of the intestine folds into the section immediately ahead of it. It typically involves the small intestine and less commonly the large intestine. Symptoms include abdominal pain which may come and go, vomiting, abdominal bloating, and bloody stool. It often results in a small bowel obstruction. Other complications may include peritonitis or bowel perforation.

The cause in children is typically unknown; in adults a lead point is sometimes present. Risk factors in children include certain infections, diseases like cystic fibrosis, and intestinal polyps. Risk factors in adults include endometriosis, bowel adhesions, and intestinal tumors. Diagnosis is often supported by medical imaging. In children, ultrasound is preferred while in adults a CT scan is preferred.

Intussusception is an emergency requiring rapid treatment. Treatment in children is typically by an enema, with surgery used if this is not successful. Dexamethasone may decrease the risk of another episode. In adults, surgical removal of part of the bowel is more often required. Intussusception occurs more commonly in children than adults. In children, males are more often affected than females. The usual age of occurrence is six to eighteen months old.

== Signs and symptoms ==
Early symptoms can include periodic abdominal pain, nausea, vomiting (sometimes green in color from bile), pulling legs to the chest area, and intermittent moderate to severe cramping abdominal pain. Pain is intermittent—not because the intussusception temporarily resolves, but because the intussuscepted bowel segment transiently stops contracting. Later signs include rectal bleeding, often with "red currant jelly" stool (stool mixed with blood and mucus), and lethargy. Physical examination may reveal a "sausage-shaped" mass, felt upon palpating the abdomen. Children, or those unable to communicate symptoms verbally, may cry, draw their knees up to their chest, or experience dyspnea (difficult or painful breathing) with paroxysms of pain. In neonates it may present with bilious vomiting and blood stained stools.

Fever is not a symptom of intussusception. However, intussusception can cause a loop of bowel to become necrotic, secondary to ischemia due to compression to arterial blood supply. This leads to perforation and sepsis, which causes fever.

In rare cases, intussusception may be a complication of Henoch–Schönlein purpura, an immune-mediated vasculitis disease in children. Such patients who develop intussusception often present with severe abdominal pain in addition to the classic signs and symptoms of HSP.

== Cause ==
Causes of intussusception are not clearly established or understood. About 90% of cases of intussusception in children arise from an unknown cause. They can include infections, anatomical factors, and altered motility.

- Meckel's diverticulum
- Polyp
- Duplication
- Appendix
- Hyperplasia of Peyer's patches
- Idiopathic

== Pathophysiology ==
Drawing of intussusception

In the most frequent type of intussusception, the ileum enters the cecum. However, other types occur, such as when a part of the ileum or jejunum prolapses into itself.

The part that prolapses into the other is called the intussusceptum, and the part that receives it is called the intussuscipiens. Almost all intussusceptions occur with the intussusceptum having been located proximally to the intussuscipiens. This is because peristaltic action of the intestine pulls the proximal segment into the distal segment. There are, however, rare reports of the opposite being true.

An anatomic lead point (that is, a piece of intestinal tissue that protrudes into the bowel lumen) is present in approximately 10% of intussusceptions. The lead point (best exemplified by a polyp) serves as a focal area of traction, which the peristaltic action pulls into the distal bowel, thus invaginating the attached bowel segment.

The trapped section of bowel may have its blood supply cut off, which causes ischemia (lack of oxygen in the tissues). The mucosa (gut lining) is very sensitive to ischemia, and responds by sloughing off into the gut. This creates the classically described "red currant jelly" stool, which is a mixture of sloughed mucosa, blood, and mucus. A study reported that in actuality, only a minority of children with intussusception had stools that could be described as "red currant jelly", and hence intussusception should be considered in the differential diagnosis of children passing any type of bloody stool.

== Diagnosis ==
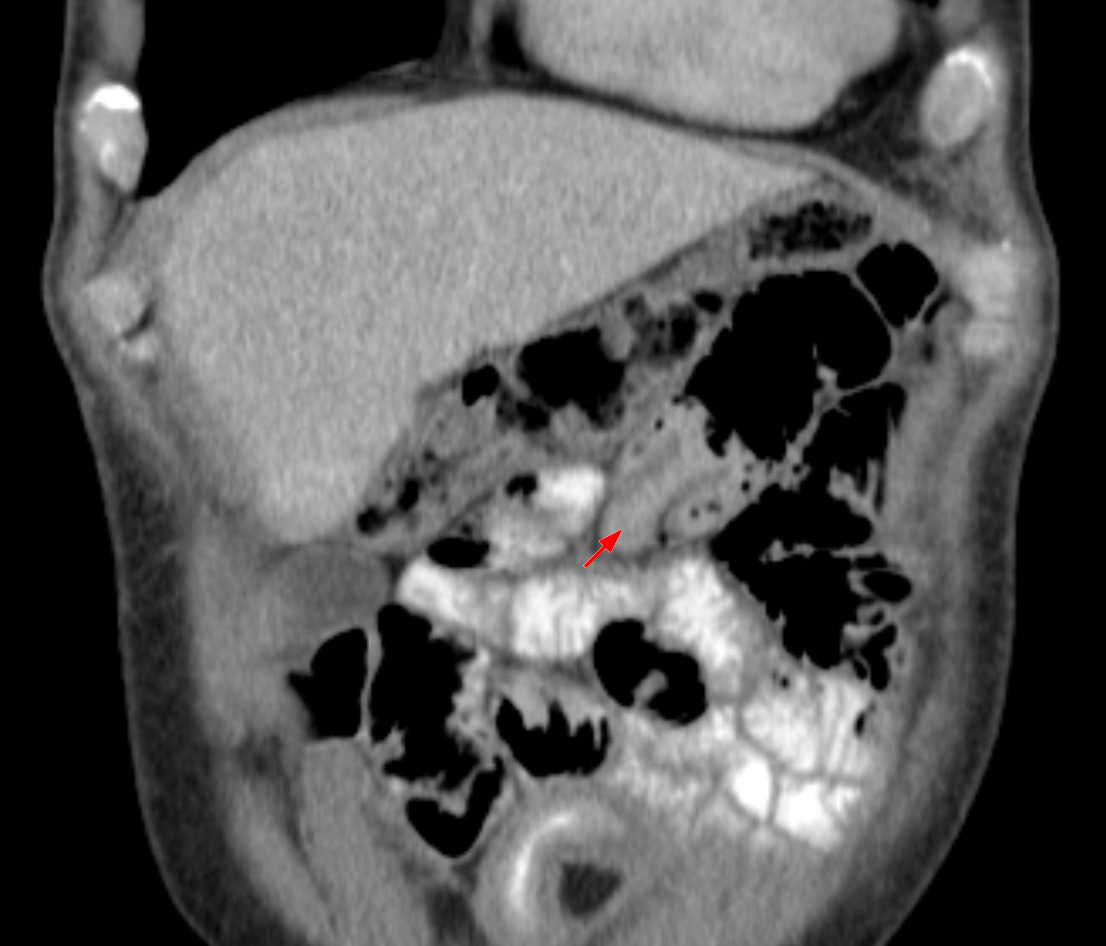
Small intestinal invagination on computed tomography

An ultrasound showing intussusception

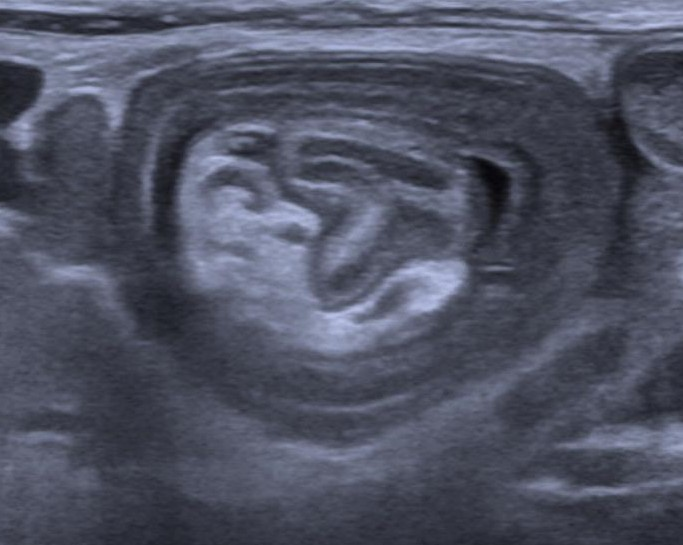
An ultrasound shows a target sign—characteristic for intussusception

An intussusception is often suspected based on history and physical exam, including observation of Dance's sign. A digital rectal examination is particularly helpful in children, as part of the intussusceptum may be felt by the finger. A definite diagnosis often requires confirmation by diagnostic imaging modalities. Ultrasound is the imaging modality of choice for diagnosis and exclusion of intussusception, due to its high accuracy and lack of radiation. The appearance of target sign (also called "doughnut sign" on a sonograph, usually around 3 cm in diameter, confirms the diagnosis. The image seen on transverse sonography or computed tomography is that of a doughnut shape, created by the hyperechoic central core of bowel and mesentery surrounded by the hypoechoic outer edematous bowel. In longitudinal imaging, intussusception resembles a sandwich. It is also called "pseudokidney" sign because hyperechoic tubular centre is covered by a hypoechoic rim producing a kidney-like appearance.

=== Classification ===
- Ileoileal – 4%
- Ileocolic (or ileocecal) – 77%
- Ileo-ileo-colic – 12%
- Colocolic – 2%
- Multiple – 1%
- Retrograde – 0.2%
- Others – 2.8%

In children, intussusception at the ileocecal junction accounts for 90 percent of all cases.

=== Differential diagnosis ===
An intussusception has two main differential diagnoses: acute gastroenteritis and rectal prolapse. Abdominal pain, vomiting, and stool with mucus and blood are present in acute gastroenteritis, but diarrhea is the leading symptom. Rectal prolapse can be differentiated by projecting mucosa that can be felt in continuity with the perianal skin, whereas in intussusception the finger may pass indefinitely into the depth of the sulcus.

== Treatment ==
The condition is not usually immediately life-threatening. The intussusception can be treated with either a barium or water-soluble contrast enema or an air-contrast enema, which both confirms the diagnosis of intussusception, and in most cases successfully reduces it. The success rate is over 80%. However, approximately 5–10% of these recur within 24 hours.

Cases where it cannot be reduced by an enema or the intestine is damaged require surgical reduction. In a surgical reduction, the surgeon opens the abdomen and manually squeezes (rather than pulls) the part that has telescoped. If the surgeon cannot successfully reduce it, or the bowel is damaged, they resect the affected section. More often, the intussusception can be reduced by laparoscopy, pulling the segments of intestine apart with forceps.

== Prognosis ==
Intussusception may become a medical emergency if not treated early, as it eventually causes death if not reduced. In developing countries where medical hospitals are not easily accessible, especially when other problems complicate the intussusception, death becomes almost inevitable. When intussusception or any other severe medical problem is suspected, the person must be taken to a hospital immediately.

The outlook for intussusception is excellent when treated quickly, but when untreated it can lead to death within two to five days. It requires fast treatment, because the longer the intestine segment is prolapsed the longer it goes without bloodflow, and the less effective a non-surgical reduction is. Prolonged intussusception also increases the likelihood of bowel ischemia and necrosis, requiring surgical resection.

== Epidemiology ==
The condition is more common in children than in adults. It strikes about 2,000 infants (one in every 1,900) in the United States in the first year of life. Its incidence begins to rise at about one to five months of life, peaks at four to nine months of age, and then gradually declines at around 18 months.

Intussusception occurs more frequently in boys than in girls, with a ratio of approximately 3:1.

In adults, intussusception represents the cause of approximately 1% of bowel obstructions and is frequently associated with neoplasm, malignant or otherwise.
