= Korissia =

Korissia Κορισσία
- Municipal unit
- Location within the regional unit

- Location within Greece
- Coordinates: 39°26′N 19°58′E
- Country: Greece
- Administrative region: Ionian Islands
- Regional unit: Corfu
- Municipality: South Corfu

Area
  - Municipal unit: 27.7 km^{2} (10.7 sq mi)

Population (2021)
  - Municipal unit: 4,364
  - Municipal unit density: 158/km^{2} (408/sq mi)
- Time zone: UTC+2 (EET)
  - Summer (DST): UTC+3 (EEST)
- Vehicle registration: ΚΥ

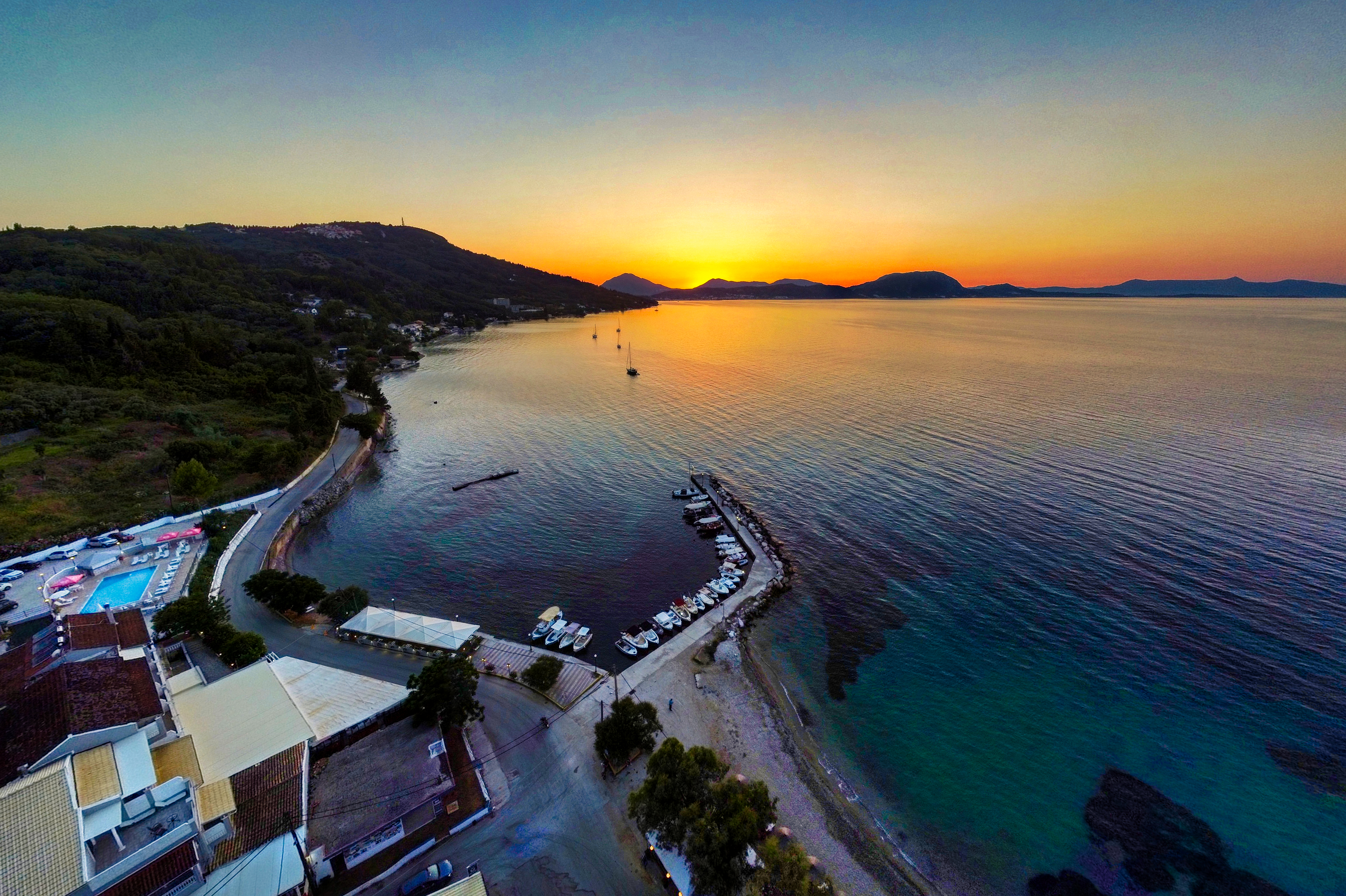
Boukaris (Boukari), Corfu

Korissia (Greek: Κορισσία) is a former municipality on the island of Corfu, Ionian Islands, Greece. Since the 2019 local government reform it is part of the municipality South Corfu, of which it is a municipal unit. It is in the southern part of the island. It has a land area of 27.675 km^{2}. The seat of the municipality was the town of Argyrades.

== Subdivisions ==
The municipal unit Korissia is subdivided into the following communities (constituent villages in brackets):

- Argyrades (Argyrades, Agios Georgios, Marathias, Neochoraki)
- Agios Nikolaos (Agios Nikolaos, Notos, Roumanades)
- Kouspades (Kouspades, Boukari)
- Perivoli (Perivoli, Potamia)
- Petriti (Petriti, Korakades)
- Vasilatika

== Population ==
Year	Population
1991	5,010
2001	5,206
2011	4,775
2021	4,364
