= Torcinello =

Italian dish of lamb intestines wrapped around lamb liver or offal

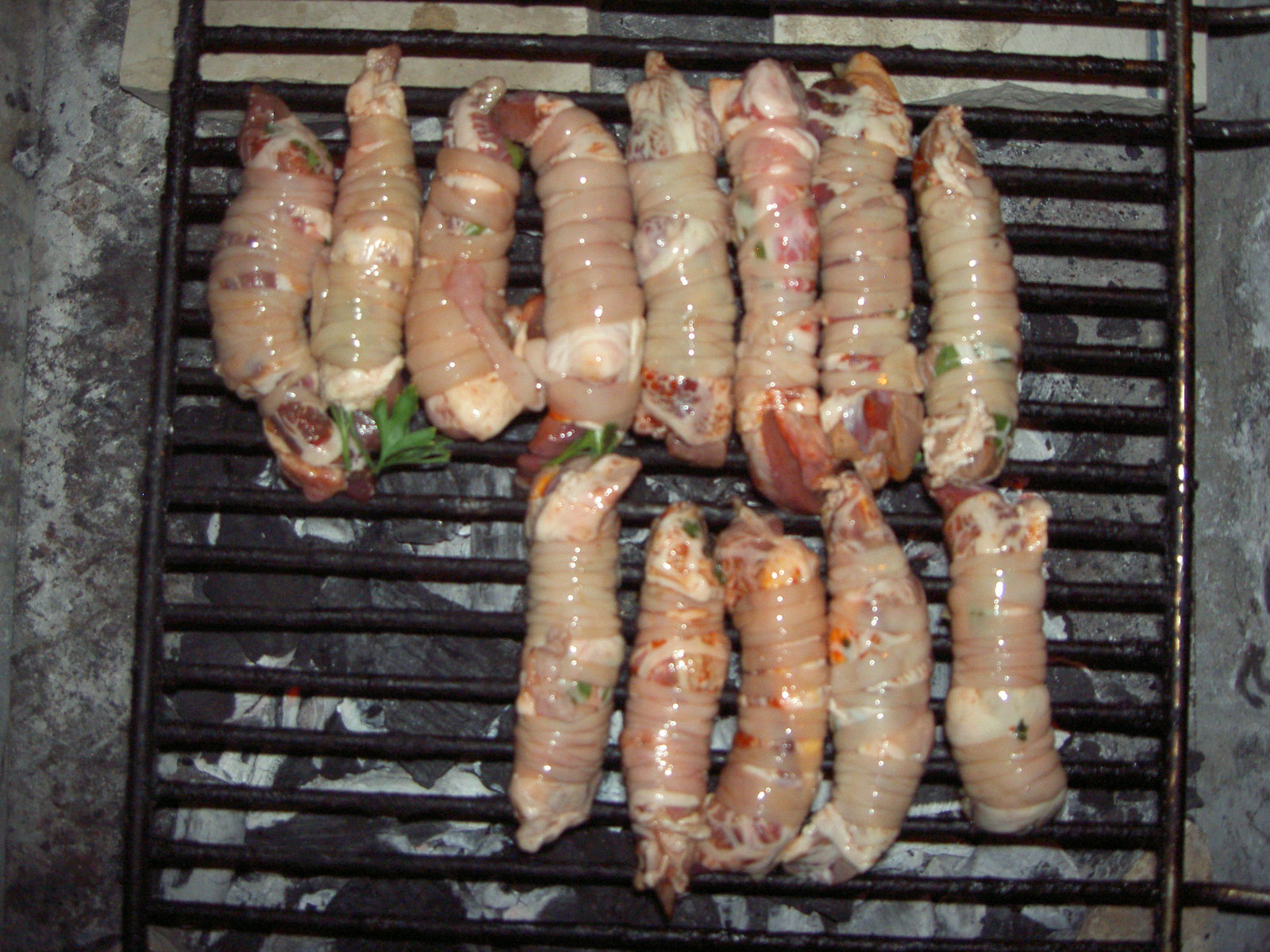
Torcinelli on the grill

Torcinello (turcenélle in the Apulian and Molise dialects; mboti, turcinieddi or turcinieddhri in the Salento dialect) is an Italian dish from Apulia and Molise consisting of lamb intestines wrapped around lamb liver or offal, typically testicles. It is generally grilled, but may also be stewed.
