= Mucin-6 =

Protein-coding gene in the species Homo sapiens

MUC6

Identifiers
- Aliases: MUC6, MUC-6, mucin 6, oligomeric mucus/gel-forming
- External IDs: OMIM: 158374; MGI: 2663233; GeneCards: MUC6

Gene location (Human)
Chr.	Chromosome 11 (human)
Band	11p15.5	Start	1,012,823 bp
Band	11p15.5	End	1,036,718 bp

Gene location (Mouse)
Chr.	Chromosome 7 (mouse)
Band	7 F5|7 87.03 cM	Start	141,633,456 bp
Band	7 F5|7 87.03 cM	End	141,655,319 bp
RNA expression pattern
Bgee	Human / Mouse (ortholog); Top expressed in: body of pancreas; duodenum; body of stomach; gallbladder; fundus; sural nerve; islet of Langerhans; right lobe of liver; right uterine tube; canal of the cervix / Top expressed in: duodenum; stomach; neural layer of retina; cerebellum; tail of embryo; skeletal muscle tissue; cerebellar cortex; human kidney; bone marrow; granulocyte; More reference expression data
BioGPS	n/a
Gene ontology
Molecular function	extracellular matrix structural constituent
Cellular component	Golgi lumen; extracellular region; plasma membrane
Biological process	maintenance of gastrointestinal epithelium; O-glycan processing; stimulatory C-type lectin receptor signaling pathway
Sources:Amigo / QuickGO
Orthologs
Databases	NCBI: entry; OMA: entry
Species	Human	Mouse
Entrez	4588	353328
Ensembl	ENSG00000283350; ENSG00000277281; ENSG00000184956; ENSG00000277518	ENSMUSG00000048191
UniProt	Q6W4X9	Q80T03; Q0VAV1
RefSeq (mRNA)	NM_005961	NM_181729; NM_001330001; NM_001368953
RefSeq (protein)	NP_005952	NP_859418.1; NP_001316930; NP_001355882
Location (UCSC)	Chr 11: 1.01 – 1.04 Mb	Chr 7: 141.63 – 141.66 Mb
PubMed search
- Wikidata
View/Edit Human	View/Edit Mouse

Mucin-6 (MUC-6), also known as gastrin mucus-6, is a protein that is encoded in the human by the MUC6 gene. MUC6, along with MUC2, MUC5AC, and MUC5B, is located within the 11p15 chromosomal locus of chromosome 11. MUC6, along with MUC1, is expressed in normal pancreases.

In the stomach it is expressed in the antrum, in the gastric mucosa in the body, and in the deeper mucous glands of the antrum.
