= Lefkimmi =

Lefkimmi Λευκίμμη
- Municipal unit
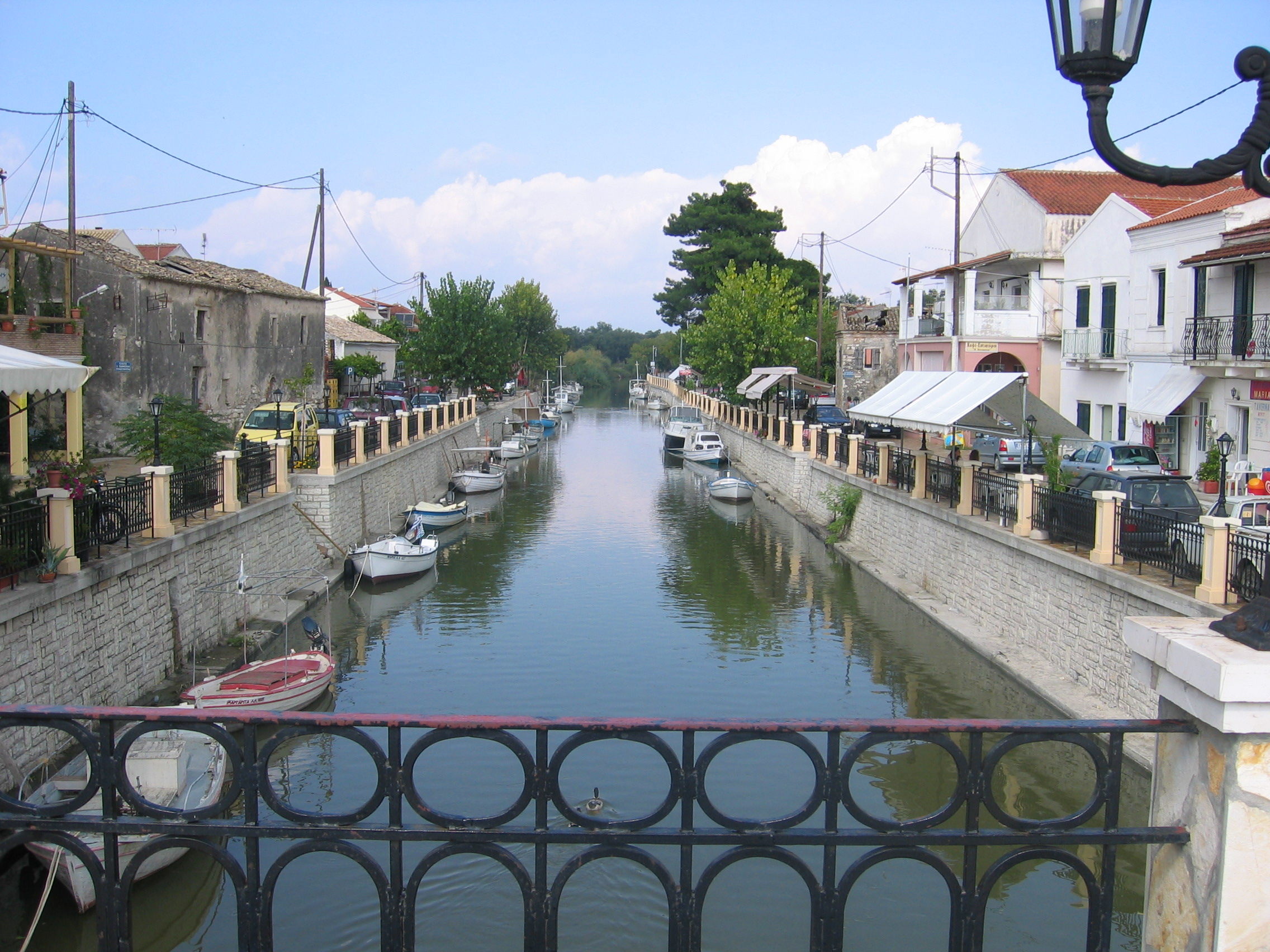
- Canal in Lefkimmi

- Location within the regional unit

- Location within Greece
- Coordinates: 39°25′N 20°04′E
- Country: Greece
- Administrative region: Ionian Islands
- Regional unit: Corfu
- Municipality: South Corfu

Area
  - Municipal unit: 48.7 km^{2} (18.8 sq mi)

Population (2021)
  - Municipal unit: 5,647
  - Municipal unit density: 116/km^{2} (300/sq mi)
  - Community: 3,323
- Time zone: UTC+2 (EET)
  - Summer (DST): UTC+3 (EEST)
- Vehicle registration: ΚΥ

Lefkimmi (Greek: Λευκίμμη, also known as Alefkimmo) is a town and a former municipality on the island of Corfu, Ionian Islands, Greece. Since the 2019 local government reform it is part of the municipality of South Corfu, of which it is a municipal unit. Its land area is 50.819 km². Lefkimmi is the southernmost municipal unit on the island. Tourism is its main industry along with agriculture and other businesses. It features beaches, restaurants, shops, taverns and hotels. A canal passes through the eastern part of the town. The municipal seat was the town of Lefkímmi. Lefkimmi also is the second largest settlement of the island.

== Subdivisions ==
The municipal unit of Lefkimmi is subdivided into the following communities (constituent villages in brackets):

- Ano Lefkimmi (Molos)
- Lefkimmi (Lefkimmi, Kavos)
- Neochori (Neochori, Dragotina, Kritika, Palaiochori, Spartera)
- Vitalades (Vitalades, Gardenos)

== Population ==
Year	Village	Community	Municipal unit
1981	2,509	-	-
1991	3,471	-	-
2001	3,517	4,364	6,704
2011	2,935	3,620	5,800
2021	2,680	3,323	5,647

== History ==
In 1804, when Corfu was part of the Septinsular Republic, 1,300 Souliote refugees arrived in Lefkimmi after their expulsion from their homeland by Ali Pasha of Yanina.

== See also ==
- List of settlements in the Corfu regional unit
