= South Corfu =

South Corfu Νότια Κέρκυρα
- Municipality
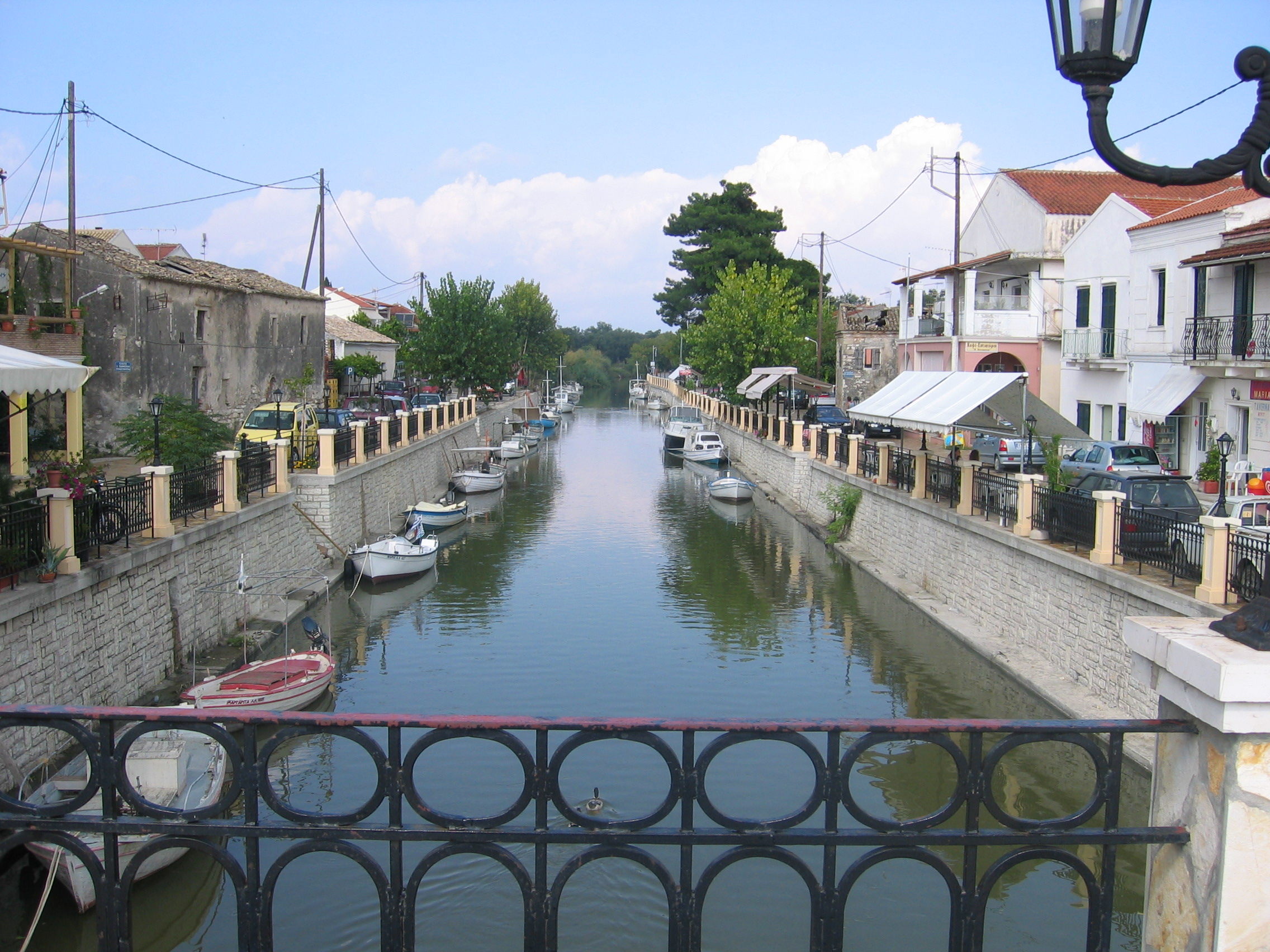
- Lefkimmi

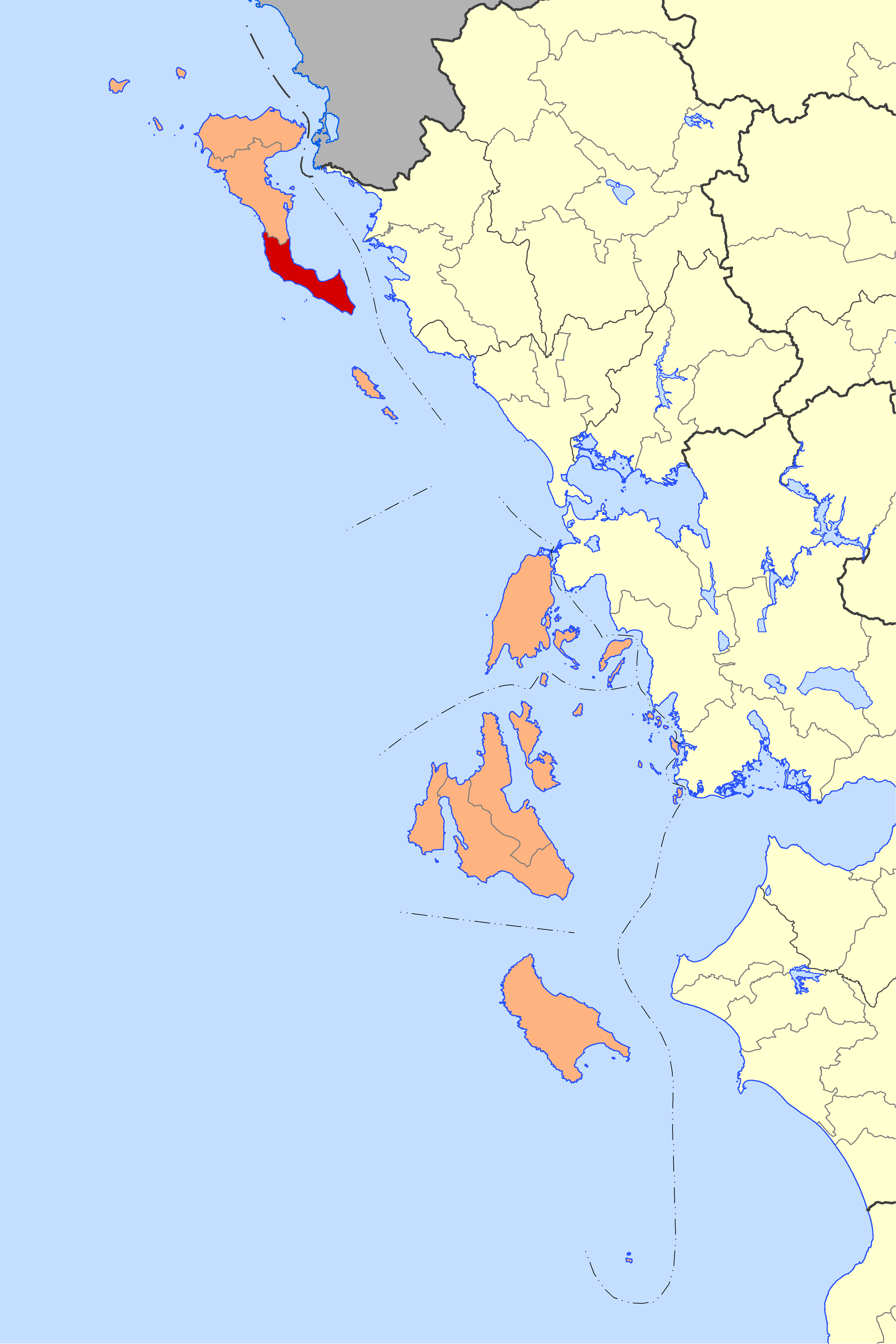

- Location within Greece
- Coordinates: 39°27′N 19°57′E
- Country: Greece
- Administrative region: Ionian Islands
- Regional unit: Corfu
- Seat: Lefkimmi

Area
  - Municipality: 145.0 km^{2} (56.0 sq mi)

Population (2021)
  - Municipality: 14,744
  - Density: 101.7/km^{2} (263.4/sq mi)
- Time zone: UTC+2 (EET)
  - Summer (DST): UTC+3 (EEST)

South Corfu (Greek: Νότια Κέρκυρα Notia Kerkyra) is a municipality on the island of Corfu in the Ionian Islands region in Greece. The municipality was formed at the 2019 local government reform, when the pre-existing municipality of Corfu was divided in three. Its seat is the village Lefkimmi.

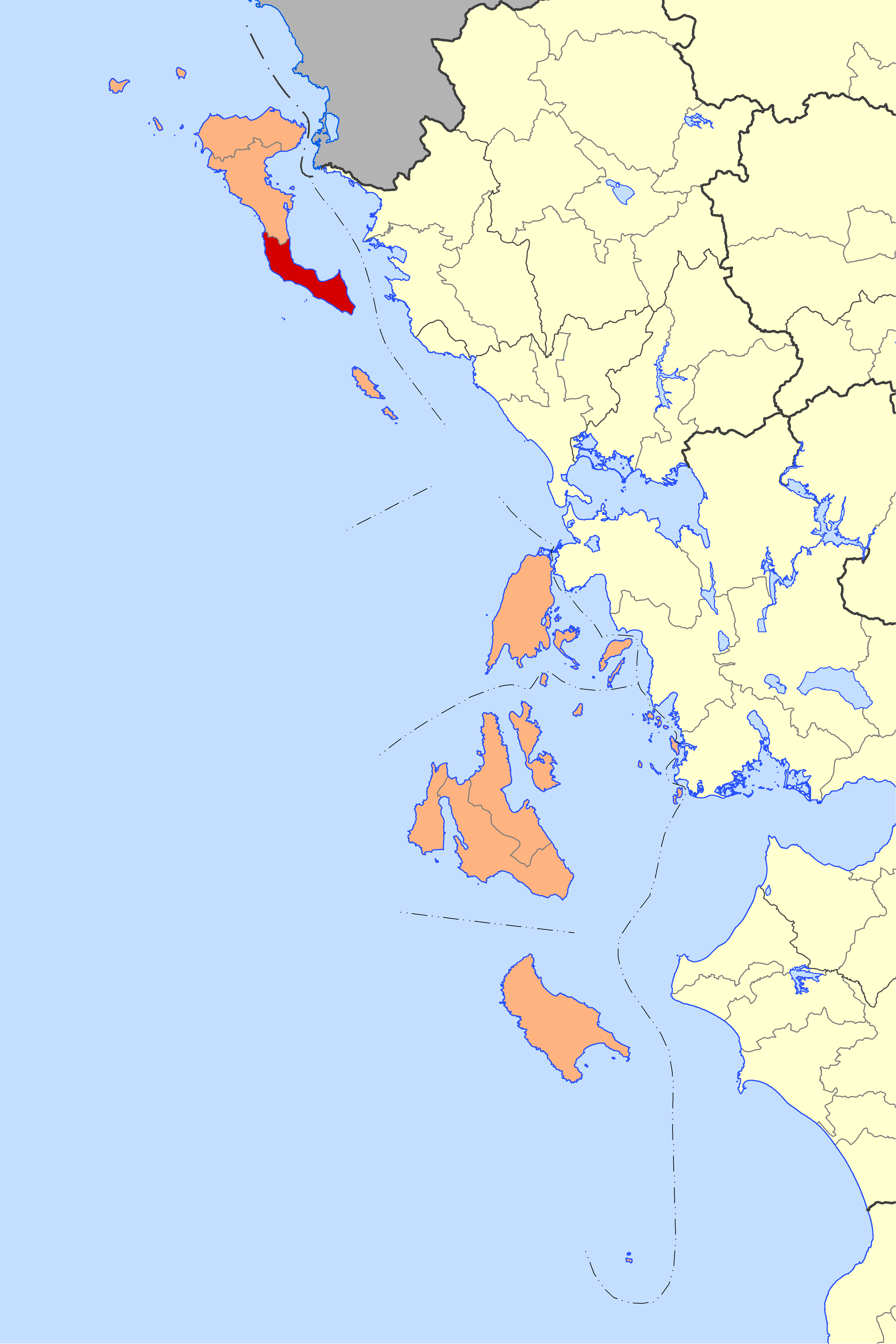
South Corfu is shown in red; the Ionian Islands Region is shown in orange

The municipality consists of the following three subdivisions (municipal units):

- Korissia
- Lefkimmi
- Meliteieis
