= List of settlements in the Corfu regional unit =

This is a list of settlements in the Corfu regional unit, Greece.

- Afionas
- Afra
- Agioi Deka
- Agioi Douloi
- Agios Athanasios
- Agios Ioannis
- Agios Markos
- Agios Matthaios
- Agios Nikolaos
- Agios Panteleimonas
- Agios Prokopios
- Agrafoi
- Agros
- Aleimmatades
- Alepou
- Ano Garouna
- Ano Korakiana
- Ano Lefkimmi
- Ano Pavliana
- Antipernoi
- Argyrades
- Arillas
- Arkadades
- Armenades
- Avliotes
- Benitses
- Chlomatiana
- Chlomos
- Chorepiskopoi
- Corfu (city)
- Dafni
- Doukades
- Drosato
- Episkepsi
- Ereikoussa
- Evropouloi
- Gaios
- Gardelades
- Gastouri
- Giannades
- Gimari
- Kalafationes
- Kamara
- Kanakades
- Kanalia
- Karousades
- Kassiopi
- Kastelannoi
- Kastellanoi
- Kato Garouna
- Kato Korakiana
- Kato Pavliana
- Kavallouri
- Kavvadades
- Klimatia
- Kokkini
- Kompitsi
- Kouramades
- Kouspades
- Krini
- Kynopiastes
- Lafki
- Lakka
- Lakones
- Lefkimmi
- Liapades
- Longos
- Loutses
- Magazia
- Magoulades
- Makrades
- Marmaro
- Mathraki
- Mesaria
- Moraitika
- Neochori
- Nisaki
- Nymfes
- Othonoi
- Pagoi
- Pelekas
- Pentati
- Perithia
- Perivoli
- Peroulades
- Petaleia
- Petriti
- Rachtades
- Sfakera
- Sgourades
- Sidari
- Sinarades
- Sini
- Skripero
- Sokraki
- Spartylas
- Stavros
- Strongyli
- Valaneio
- Varypatades
- Vasilatika
- Vatos
- Velonades
- Viros
- Vitalades
- Vouniatades
- Xanthates
- Zygos

== See also ==
- List of towns and villages of Greece
