= Doukades =

Doukades Δουκάδες
- Community
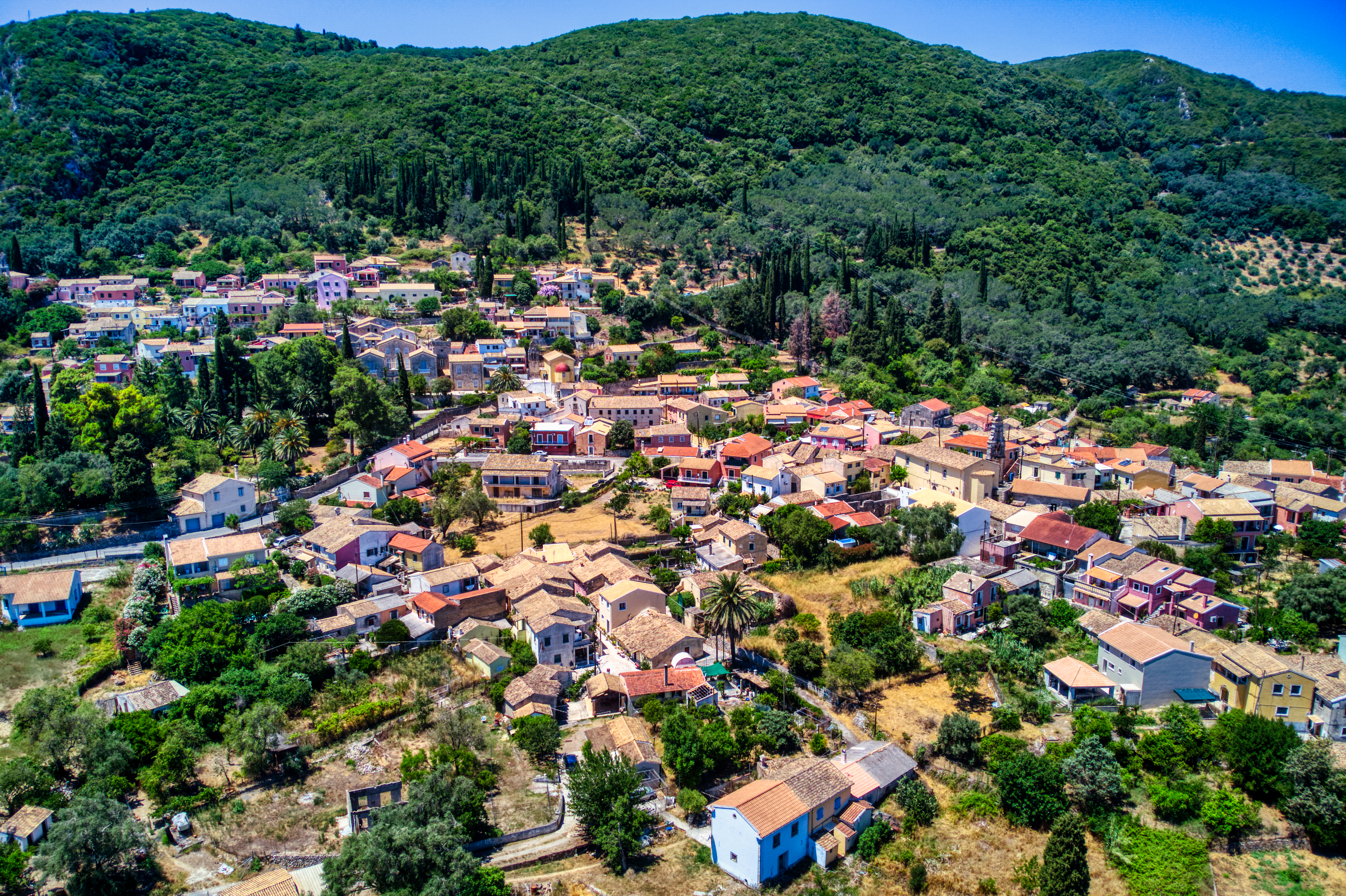

- Location within Greece
- Coordinates: 39°41′N 19°44′E
- Country: Greece
- Administrative region: Ionian Islands
- Regional unit: Corfu
- Municipality: Central Corfu and Diapontia Islands
- Municipal unit: Palaiokastritsa

Population (2021)
  - Community: 487
- Time zone: UTC+2 (EET)
  - Summer (DST): UTC+3 (EEST)
- Vehicle registration: ΚΥ

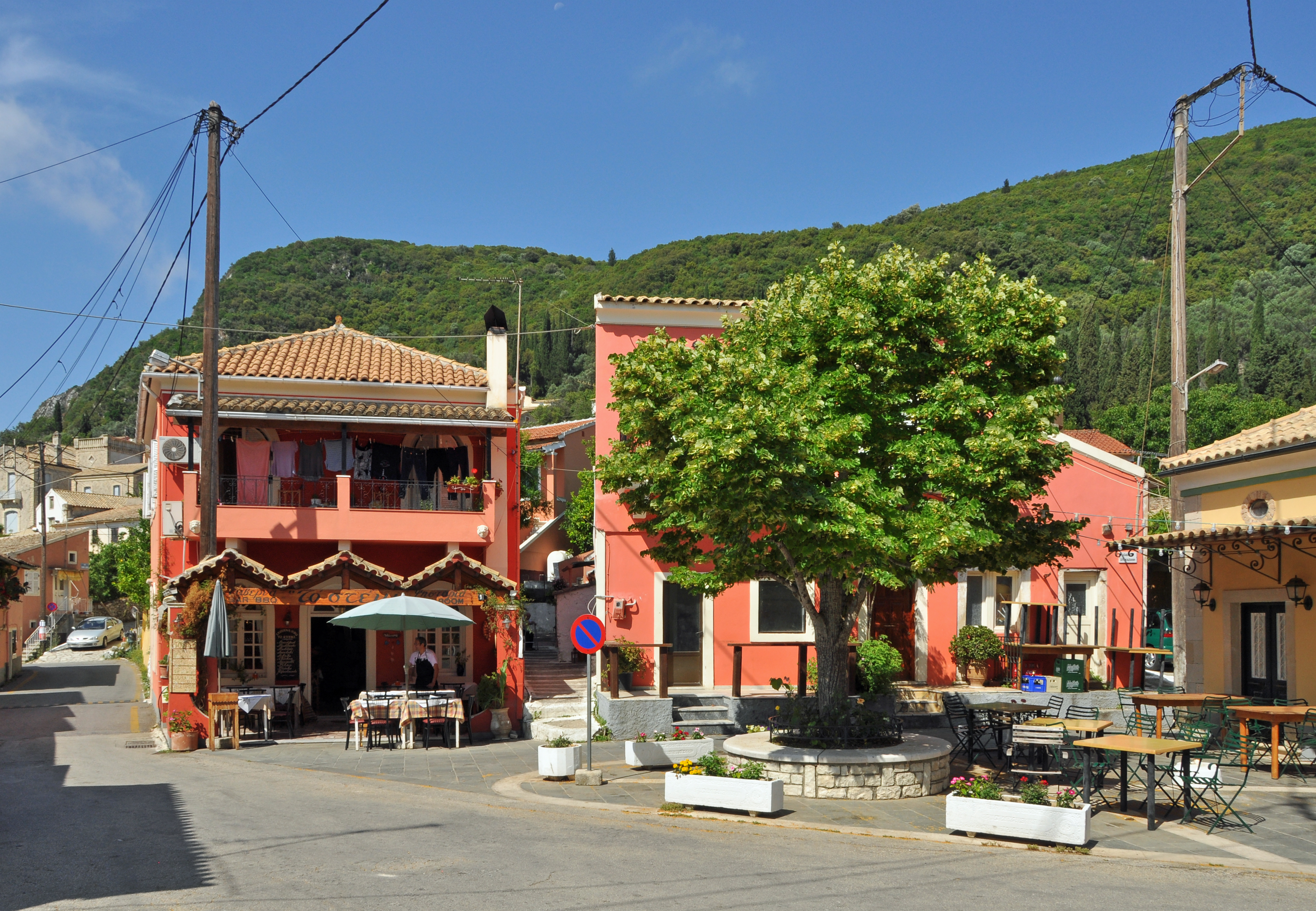
Doukades: the village centre

Doukades (Greek: Δουκάδες) is a village and a community in the northwestern part of the island of Corfu. It is located in the municipal unit of Palaiokastritsa. The community includes the village Papathanatika. Hills dominate the area.

== Population ==
Year	Settlement population	Community population
1981	491	-
1991	492	-
2001	678	689
2011	630	724
2021	407	487

== History ==
According to I. Bounia, the name of the settlement came from its first inhabitants who bore the name Doukas (Δούκας, meaning duke). The earliest written reference to Doukades is a notary writing from 1616. Of interest are the restored stone mansion of the family Theotokis, the Venetian type "Sagrado" of Kouartano, and the building of the elementary school at the entrance of the village.

Doukades was characterized as a traditional settlement with the law of October 19, 1978 No. 594 IV / November 13, 1998 (Codical statistics, number 22.1.137.01).

== See also ==
- List of settlements in the Corfu regional unit
