= Ano Korakiana =

Greek village

Ano Korakiana Άνω Κορακιάνα
- Community
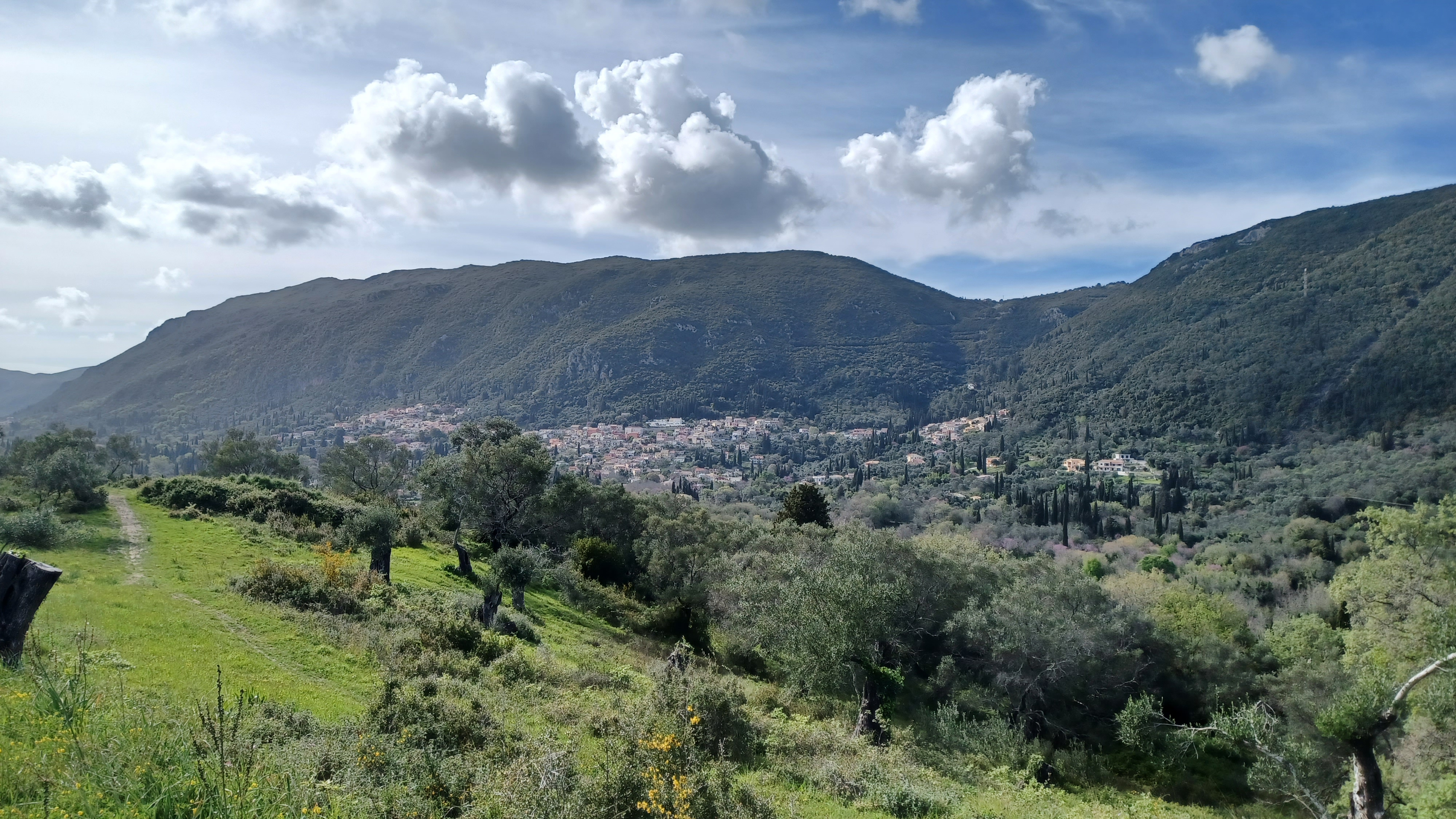
- Ano Korakiana

- Location within Greece
- Country: Greece
- Administrative region: Ionian Islands
- Regional unit: Corfu
- Municipality: Central Corfu and Diapontian Islands
- Municipal unit: Faiakes

Population (2021)
  - Community: 1,161
- Time zone: UTC+2 (EET)
  - Summer (DST): UTC+3 (EEST)

Ano Korakiana (Greek: Άνω Κορακιάνα) is a Greek village on the island of Corfu. It is located between the low mountains "Koraki" and "Korentis", near the southwestern foothills of Pantokrator, at the intersection of the provincial roads to Kato Korakiana and Pyrgi, at an average altitude of 170 meters. It is approximately 19 kilometers northwest of Corfu town.

Ano Korakiana has many churches and cultural associations. It is the birthplace of the sculptor Aristeidis Metallinos.
