= Agios Prokopios, Corfu =

Agios Prokopios Άγιος Προκόπιος
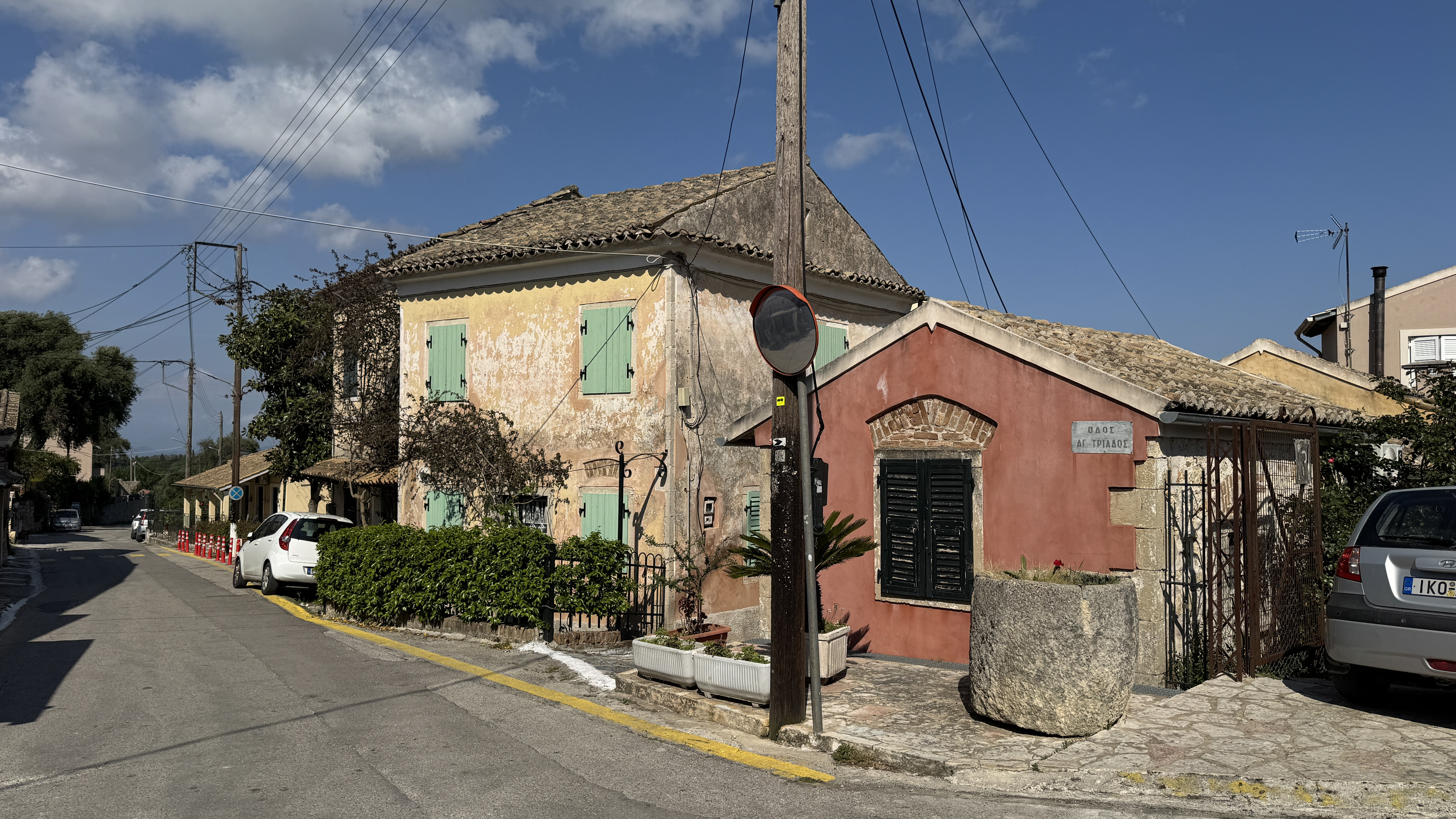

- Location in Greece
- Coordinates: 39°34′15.8″N 19°52′29.1″E
- Country: Greece
- Decentralized administration: Peloponnese, W. Greece and Ionian
- Region: Ionian Islands
- Regional unit: Corfu
- Municipality: Central Corfu and Diapontia Islands
- Municipal unit: Achilleio
- Elevation: 130 m (430 ft)

Population (2021)
  - Total: 413
- Postal code: 490 84

Agios Prokopios (Greek: Άγιος Προκόπιος, formerly Ψωραροί - Psoraroi) is a traditional settlement in Corfu, Greece. Since the 2011 local government reform, it is part of the municipality of Central Corfu and Diapontia Islands. It is located 8.8 kilometers from the city of Corfu.

== Name and history ==
In historical sources, the settlement is first mentioned in 1381 as a barony or fiefdom under the name Psorarci, while from 1497 it appears as the "village of the Psoraraioi".

The oldest name of the village was "Psoraroi". In 1936 it was renamed from Psoraroi to Agios Prokopios.

Administratively, it always belonged to the Mesi region, as it is located almost in the center of the island. Local administration was exercised by village residents, called elders or primates. With the creation of the first municipalities in 1866, it became a settlement of the Municipality of Astygeitones, which later (1869) merged into the Municipality of Mesochorites. By Royal Decree on March 5, 1919, the Community of Psoraroi was established.

It formed a separate community from 1936 until 1995, when it joined the communities of Gastouri and Kynopiastes to form the Municipality of Achilleio.

== Architecture ==
The village was declared a traditional settlement in 1978. Residentially, it represents a typical example of local architecture, as it consists of residential complexes (neighborhoods) that bear pure traditional elements.

It consists of the following neighborhoods:

- Kardatika
- Mamalatika
- Kato Geitonia

For several residences that are preserved today, there are records dating back to the 16th century.

== Monuments and sights ==
=== Churches ===
There are three churches in the village. Ecclesiastically, it falls under the Sinarades Archieratical District of the Metropolis of Corfu, Paxoi and the Diapontian Islands.

- Church of Agios Vasileios: One of the oldest buildings, which existed as early as the beginning of the 16th century (1511). The frescoes are examples of domestic folk art.
- Church of Agios Prokopios: Mentioned in sources since the early 16th century. Around the end of the 19th century, it was completely destroyed by fire. A larger church was built on the foundations of this small church, and a tower-like belfry was erected, completed in 1937.
- Church of Agia Triada: The church of the Holy Trinity was inaugurated in 1745. It bears representative examples of the traditional architecture of the island's churches. The iconostasis—made of stone and plaster—is decorated with the "vine" motif and frescoes by famous painters of their time, such as the priest Theodoros Angelatos and the hieromonk Daniel Koklas. Besides the portable icons, there are preserved frescoes from the mid-18th century.

=== Natural environment ===
An important element of the village's natural environment is the "olive tree of Agios Prokopios", which is considered perhaps the oldest and largest olive tree on the island. This tree is located southeast of the hill of Agios Prokopios, inside the village.

=== Climate ===
Agios Prokopios has a temperate climate. The average temperature is 18 °C. The warmest month is July, at 28 °C, and the coldest is January, at 9 °C. The average rainfall is 1,492 millimeters per year. The wettest month is February, with 232 millimeters of rain, and the driest is August, with 8 millimeters.

Climate data for Agios Prokopios
| Month | Jan | Feb | Mar | Apr | May | Jun | Jul | Aug | Sep | Oct | Nov | Dec | Year |
|---|---|---|---|---|---|---|---|---|---|---|---|---|---|
| Mean daily maximum °C (°F) | 12 (54) | 12 (54) | 12 (54) | 17 (63) | 22 (72) | 26 (79) | 32 (90) | 30 (86) | 27 (81) | 20 (68) | 18 (64) | 15 (59) | 20 (69) |
| Daily mean °C (°F) | 9 (48) | 9 (48) | 10.5 (50.9) | 14 (57) | 19 (66) | 22.5 (72.5) | 28.5 (83.3) | 27 (81) | 24.5 (76.1) | 18 (64) | 17.5 (63.5) | 13.5 (56.3) | 17.8 (63.9) |
| Mean daily minimum °C (°F) | 6 (43) | 6 (43) | 9 (48) | 11 (52) | 16 (61) | 19 (66) | 25 (77) | 24 (75) | 22 (72) | 16 (61) | 17 (63) | 12 (54) | 15 (60) |
| Average rainfall mm (inches) | 179 (7.0) | 232 (9.1) | 130 (5.1) | 96 (3.8) | 77 (3.0) | 30 (1.2) | 21 (0.8) | 8 (0.3) | 118 (4.6) | 181 (7.1) | 226 (8.9) | 194 (7.6) | 1,492 (58.7) |

== Culture and customs ==
Like all villages in Corfu, and especially in the Mesi area, it maintains its traditional customs to this day.

- Easter: Besides the religious events of Holy Week, on the second day of the Easter week (Nia Deftera), there is a procession of the double-sided icon of the Virgin Mary (Madre della Consolazione) and the Resurrection of the Lord. This procession has been documented since 1671.
- Festivals: On the Sunday of All Saints, a festival takes place next to the homonymous Holy Church of Agia Triada and All Saints. A few weeks later (July 8), one of the oldest and most famous festivals of the island takes place, in honor of the feast of Agios Prokopios.

=== Associations ===
Various cultural or agricultural associations have operated in the village over time (Musical Society since 1925, People's Bank since 1926, Farm Boys Association since 1950, etc.).

Today, the Cultural Association (founded in 1980) operates a mixed choir and a photography group, while various events are organized periodically (theatrical and dance performances, concerts, exhibitions, etc.) by members of the Association or by visiting groups.

== Historical population ==
Historical population
| Year | Pop. | ±% |
|---|---|---|
| 1940 | 497 | — |
| 1951 | 424 | −14.7% |
| 1961 | 413 | −2.6% |
| 1971 | 338 | −18.2% |
| 1981 | 260 | −23.1% |
| 1991 | 388 | +49.2% |
| 2001 | 380 | −2.1% |
| 2011 | 378 | −0.5% |
| 2021 | 413 | +9.3% |

== Bibliography ==
- Karydis, Dimitrios E-G (1997). Το χωρίον των Ψωραραίων [The village of the Psoraraioi]. Corfu: Cultural Association of Agios Prokopios Corfu.
- Karydis, Spyros Ch. (1986). "Άγιος Προκόπιος (Ψωραροί)" [Agios Prokopios (Psoraroi)]. Χρονικά των Κορυφών. 6.
