= Ipsos, Corfu =

Ipsos Ύψος
- Community
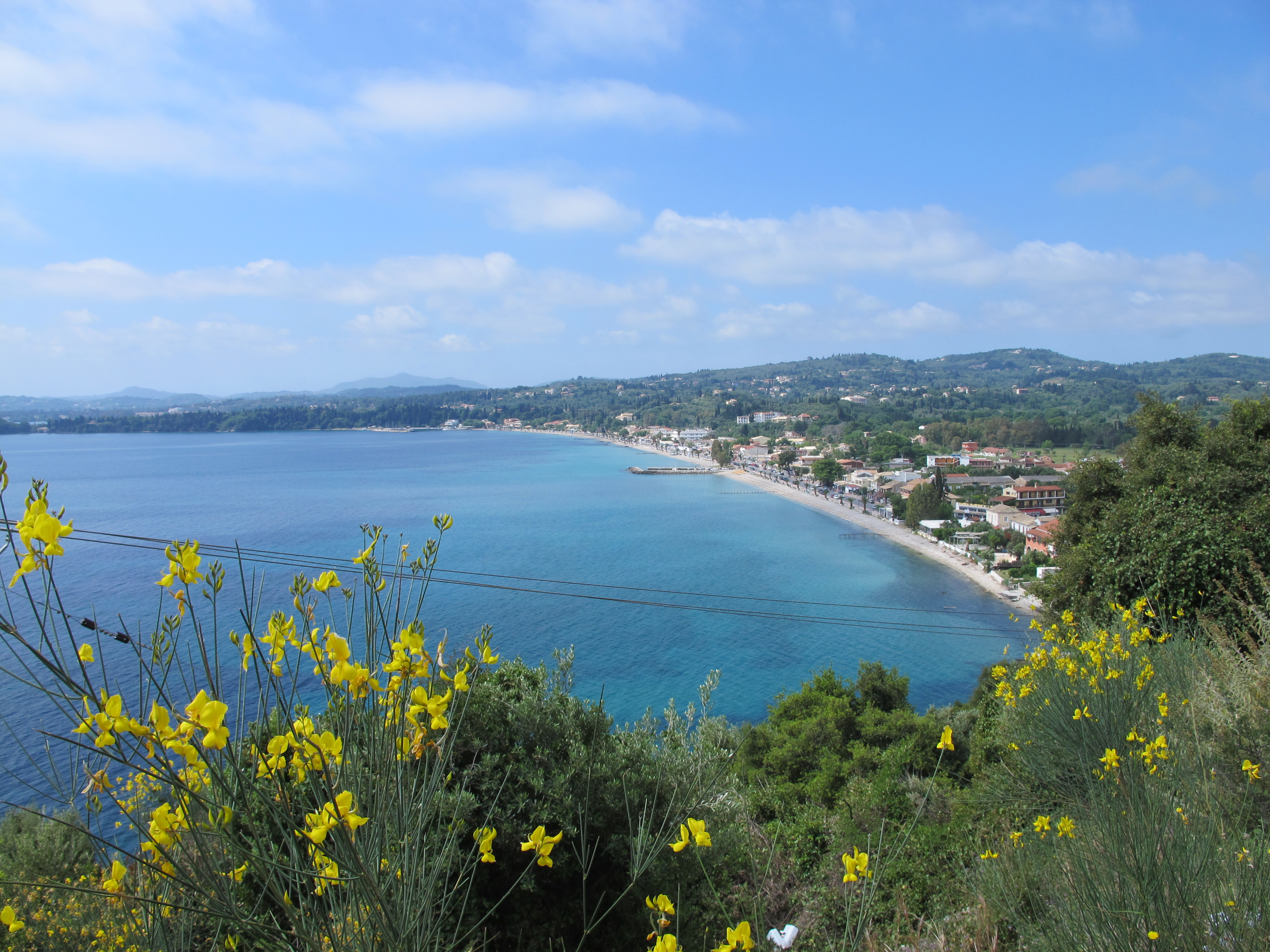
- Ipsos

- Location within Greece
- Country: Greece
- Administrative region: Ionian Islands
- Regional unit: Corfu
- Municipality: Central Corfu and Diapontian Islands
- Municipal unit: Faiakes

Population (2021)
  - Community: 577
- Time zone: UTC+2 (EET)
  - Summer (DST): UTC+3 (EEST)

Ipsos, also written as Ypsos (Greek: Ύψος), is a Greek village on the island of Corfu. It is the seat of the Faiakes community in the municipality of Central Corfu and Diapontian Islands.

== Overview ==
The area was relatively untouched until the 1970s, when it began to develop as a tourist resort on account of its long sandy beach and clear, calm water. Today it features various types of holiday accommodation, along with bars, restaurants, bakeries, night clubs, a medical centre, shops and supermarkets. It also hosts a marina, a small fishing port, a police station and a local government office (KEP) which services the surrounding community.
