= Agios Markos =

Agios Markos Άγιος Μάρκος
- Community
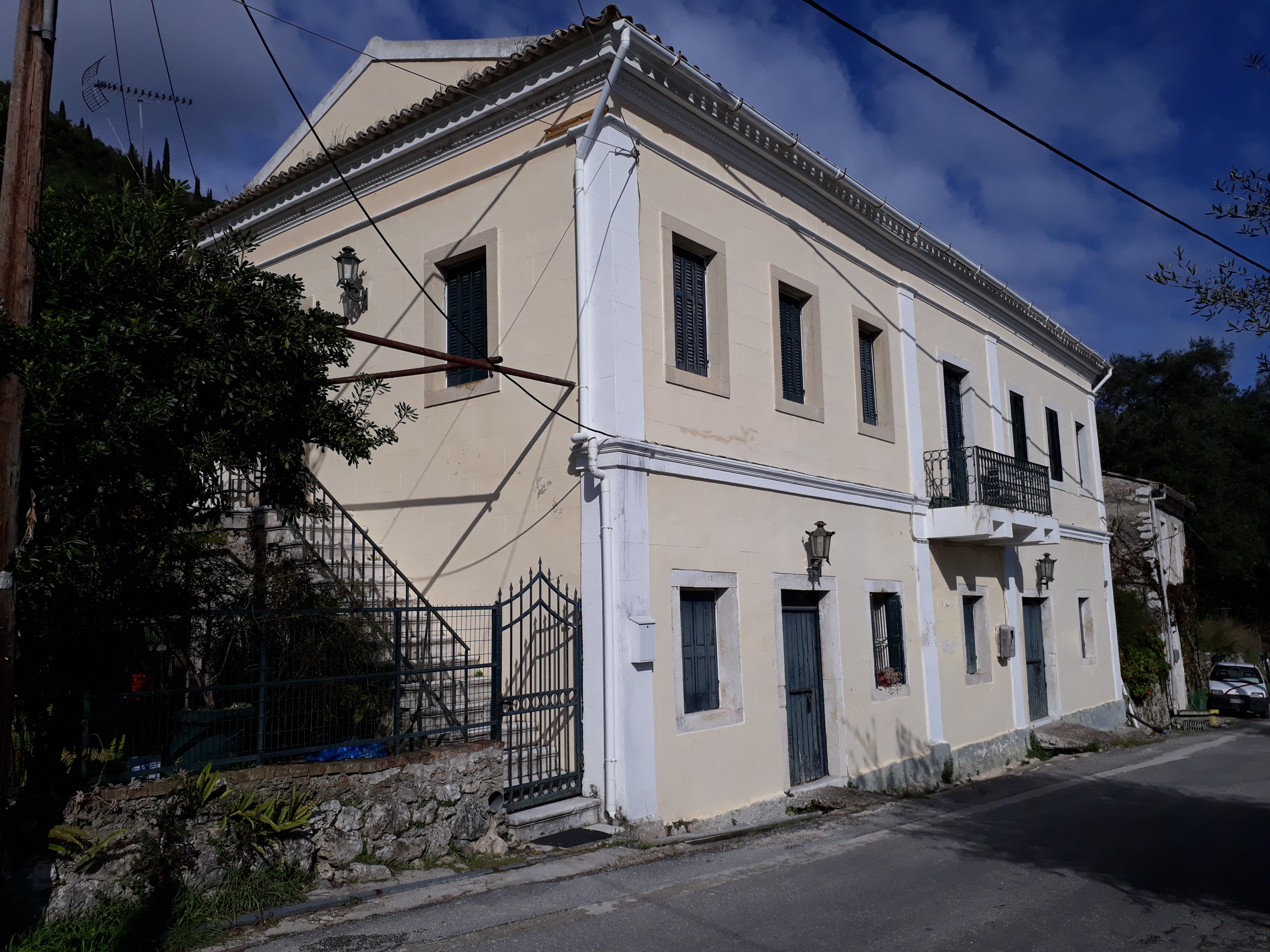
- Agios Markos

- Location within Greece
- Country: Greece
- Administrative region: Ionian Islands
- Regional unit: Corfu
- Municipality: Central Corfu and Diapontian Islands
- Municipal unit: Faiakes

Population (2021)
  - Community: 892
- Time zone: UTC+2 (EET)
  - Summer (DST): UTC+3 (EEST)

Agios Markos (Greek: Άγιος Μάρκος) is a Greek village on the island of Corfu.

== Overview ==
Agios Markos is one of the oldest villages on Corfu. It has two churches: Agios Merkourios (1075), which is today located on private land, and the Church of Christ the Pantocrator (1577) in the center of the village. Agios Markos was an important settlement during Venetian rule (1386 to 1797).

In 1962, a landslide severely damaged the village and forced residents to move to the plain of Ipsos, where a new village called Kato (Lower) or Neos (New) Agios Markos was constructed for them. Agios Markos was declared a traditional settlement in 1978 and a historical monument in 1996. Since the 1980s, locals have been gradually restoring the village houses to their previous splendor.
