= Liapades =

Liapades Λιαπάδες
- Community
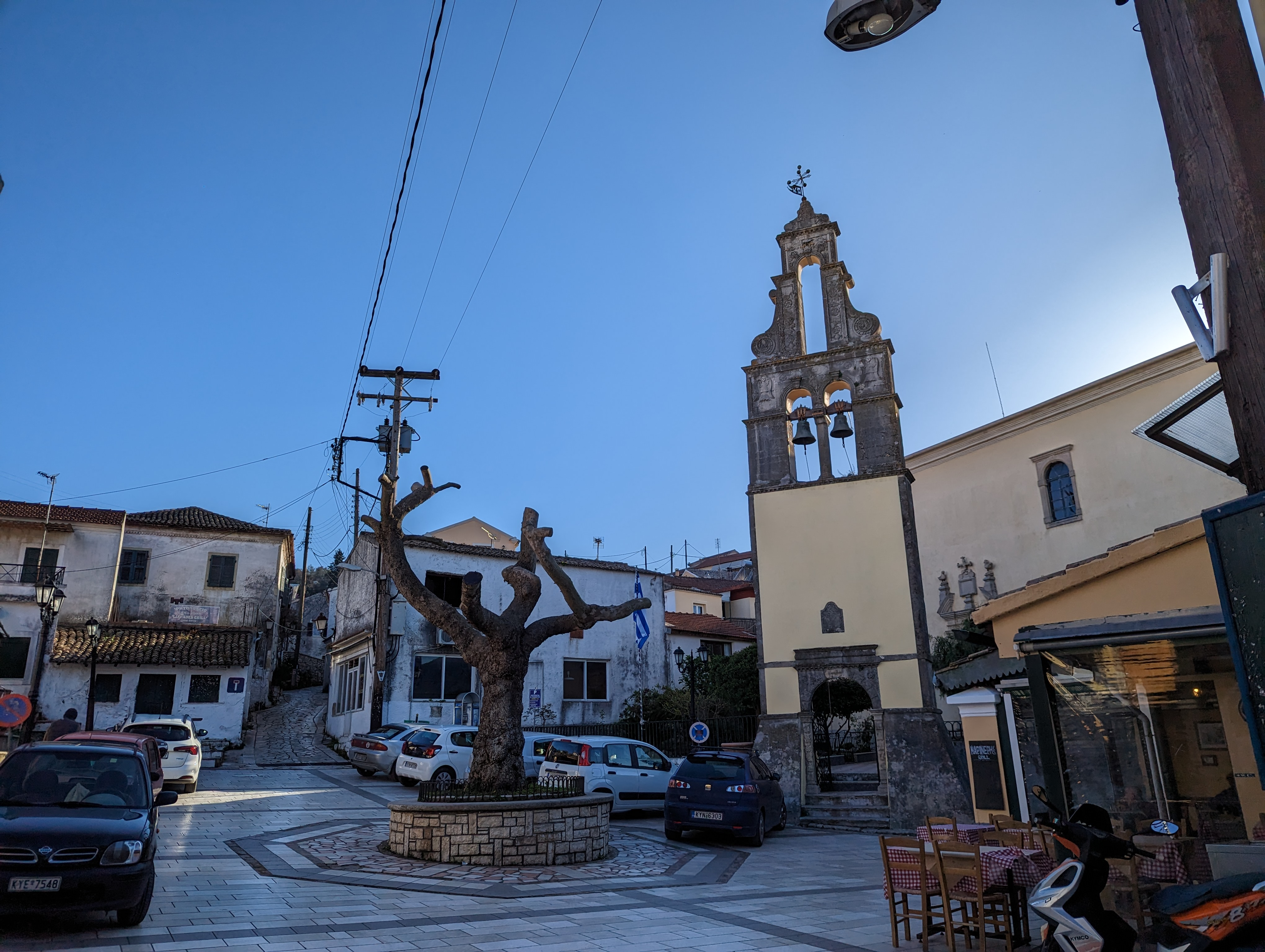
- Liapades

- Location within Greece
- Coordinates: 39°40′N 19°44′E
- Country: Greece
- Administrative region: Ionian Islands
- Regional unit: Corfu
- Municipality: Central Corfu and Diapontia Islands
- Municipal unit: Palaiokastritsa

Population (2021)
  - Community: 938
- Time zone: UTC+2 (EET)
  - Summer (DST): UTC+3 (EEST)
- Vehicle registration: ΚΥ

Liapades (Greek: Λιαπάδες) is a medium-sized village located on the northwest side of Corfu, 3 km (2 miles) away from Palaiokastritsa. It has a quiet, agriculture-based economy during the winter. In the summer, the local industry mostly relies on the tourist trade, although the place is by no means mainstream. Liapades is situated on the sides of Kourkouli mountain, and spread right up to the North Valley (Πάνω Λιβάδι in Greek).

== Settlements ==
- Liapades
- Gefyra

== Population ==
| Year | Settlement population | Community population |
|---|---|---|
| 1981 | 1,032 | - |
| 1991 | 1,046 | - |
| 2001 | 958 | 1,037 |
| 2011 | 879 | 931 |
| 2021 | 916 | 938 |

== Churches in Liapades ==
There are two main Orthodox churches in the village, one in the main square (St. Anastasia/Αγία Αναστασία in Greek) and one near the village's elementary school (St. Thecla/Αγία Θέκλη). Υπάρχει ακόμη, ο Άγιος Νικόλαος, Η Παναγία Οδηγήτρια, οι Άγιοι Θεόδωροι και η Αγία Αναστασία η Ρωμαία.

== Beaches in/near Liapades ==
The village's main beach (i.e. the one that's reached by the main road) is called Giofyra (Γιόφυρα, meaning Bridge in Greek), but there are other beaches that can be reached through pathways, sometimes through dense vegetation. Some of the most popular ones are Rovinia beach, Chomi beach (can only be reached by sea, there are organised trips from nearby beaches), Liniodoro beach (Λινιόδωρο, roughly translates as "Gift from the Sun" = Ηλίου δώρον (Heliou doron, Iliou doron), ancient Greek), Limni beach and the renowned Palaiokastritsa beach, featuring a sandy beach and turquoise waters (usually too cold to swim in, due to the strong currents of the Adriatic Sea).

There is an ongoing research about the village's history in the past 50 years, containing various anecdotes and information, which will be published within the year.

== See also ==
- List of settlements in the Corfu regional unit
