= Kassopaia =

Kassopaia Κασσωπαία
- Municipal unit
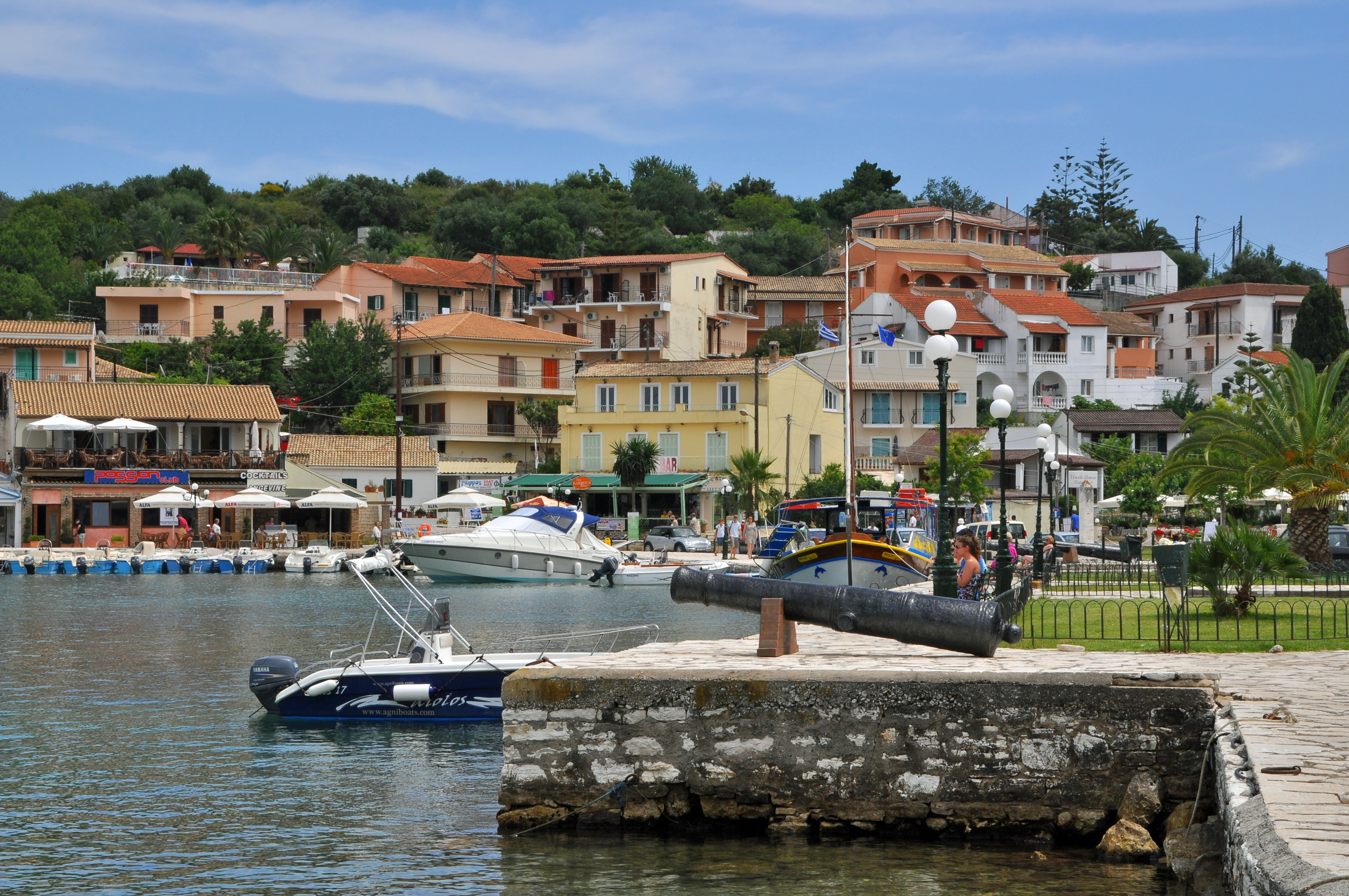
- Kassiopi

- Location within the regional unit

- Location within Greece
- Coordinates: 39°47′N 19°55′E
- Country: Greece
- Administrative region: Ionian Islands
- Regional unit: Corfu
- Municipality: North Corfu

Area
  - Municipal unit: 33.7 km^{2} (13.0 sq mi)

Population (2021)
  - Municipal unit: 2,281
  - Municipal unit density: 67.7/km^{2} (175/sq mi)
- Time zone: UTC+2 (EET)
  - Summer (DST): UTC+3 (EEST)
- Vehicle registration: ΚΥ

Kassopaia (Greek: Κασσωπαία) is a former municipality on the island of Corfu, Ionian Islands, Greece. Since the 2019 local government reform it is part of the municipality North Corfu, of which it is a municipal unit. It is located in the northeasternmost tip of the island of Corfu. It has a land area of 33.749 km^{2} and a population of 2,281 (2021 census). The seat of the municipality was the village Gimari.

== Subdivisions ==
The municipal unit Kassopaia is subdivided into the following communities (constituent villages in brackets):

- Gimari (Gimari, Vlachatika, Kavalleraina, Kalami, Kentroma, Plagia, Rachi)
- Kassiopi (Kassiopi, Agios Georgios, Imerolia, Kellia, Lithiasmenos, Pigi, Plateia, Podolakkos, Psyllos dyo, Psyllos ena)
- Nisaki (Nisaki, Apolysoi, Vinglatouri, Katavolos)
- Sini (Agnitsini, Agios Stefanos Kassiopi, Vingla, Karyotiko, Kokkini, Kokkokylas, Kremithas, Mengoulas, Porta, Rou, Santa, Sarakinatika,

== Islets ==
- Peristeres
- Plateia
- Psyllos dyo
- Psyllos ena

== Population ==
Year	Population
1991	2,405
2001	2,787
2011	2,185
2021	2,281

== See also ==
- List of settlements in the Corfu regional unit
