= Palaiokastritsa =

Village on the Greek island of Corfu

Palaiokastritsa Παλαιοκαστρίτσα
- Municipal unit
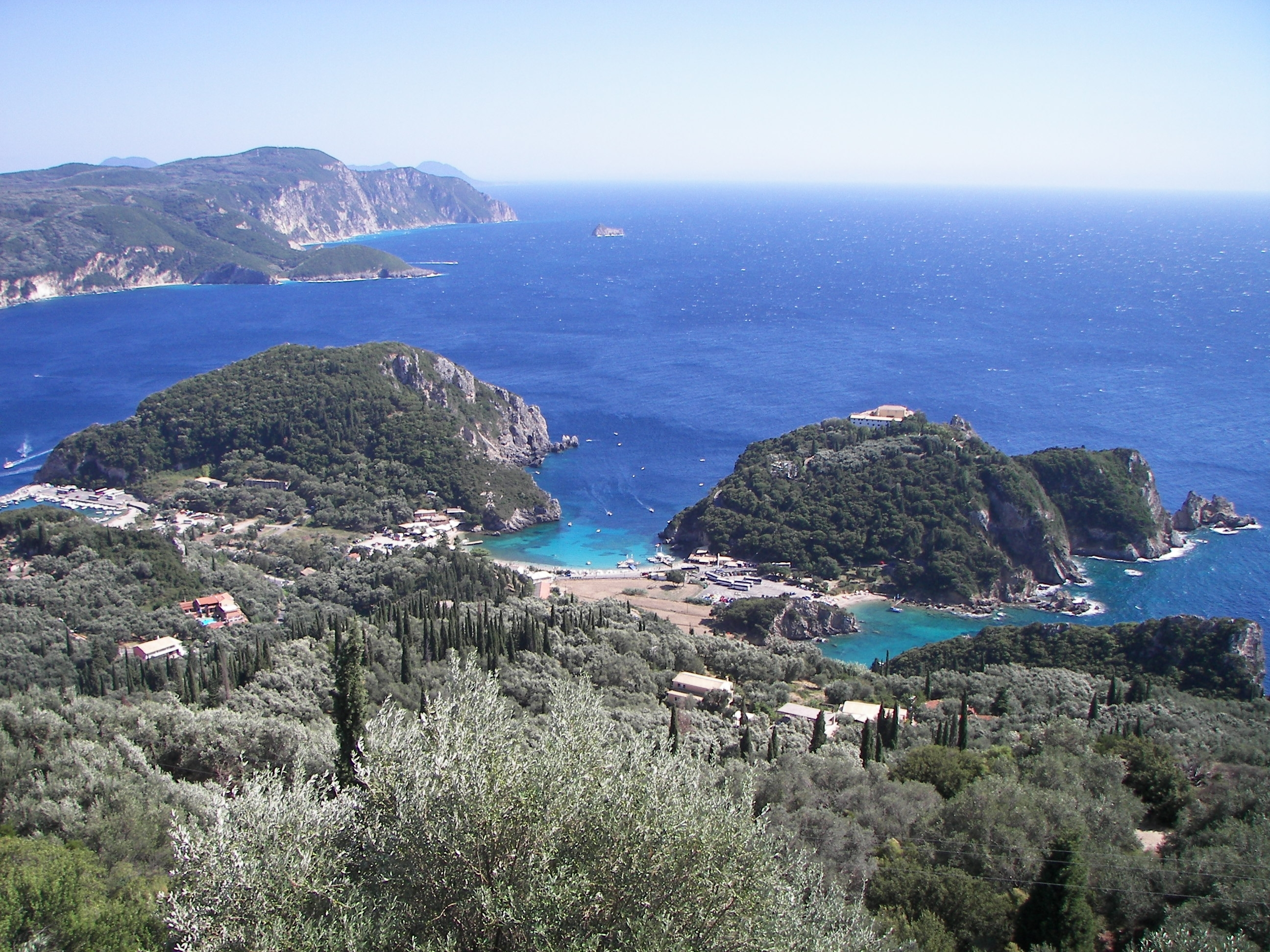
- The bay of Palaiokastritsa. The rock in the sea visible near the horizon at the top centre-left of the picture is considered by the locals to be the mythical petrified ship of Odysseus. The side of the rock toward the mainland is curved in such a way as to resemble the extended sail of a trireme. The historic monastery of Palaiokastritsa can be seen at the top of the hill of the peninsula to the right of the picture.

- Location within the regional unit

- Location within Greece
- Coordinates: 39°41′N 19°43′E
- Country: Greece
- Administrative region: Ionian Islands
- Regional unit: Corfu
- Municipality: Central Corfu and Diapontia Islands

Area
  - Municipal unit: 48.4 km^{2} (18.7 sq mi)

Population (2021)
  - Municipal unit: 3,389
  - Municipal unit density: 70.0/km^{2} (181/sq mi)
- Time zone: UTC+2 (EET)
  - Summer (DST): UTC+3 (EEST)
- Vehicle registration: ΚΥ

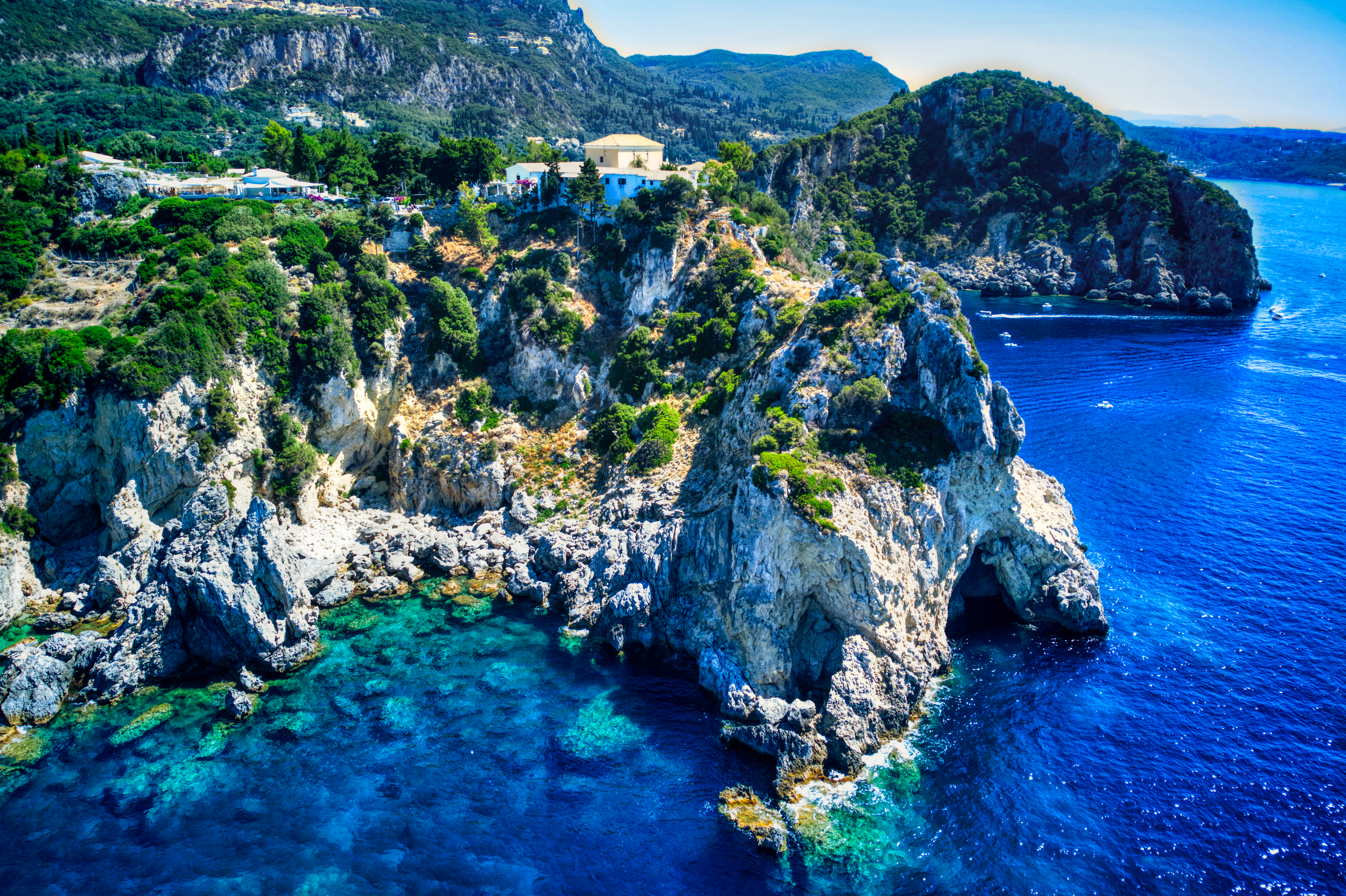
Moni Palaiokastritsas, Paleokastritsa Monastery

Palaiokastritsa (Greek: Παλαιοκαστρίτσα meaning 'Old Little Castle', referring to nearby Angelokastro) is a village in northwestern Corfu, Greece. Corfu has been suggested to be the mythical island of the Phaeacians and the bay of Palaiokastritsa to be the place where Odysseus disembarked and met Nausicaa for the first time. The monastery in Palaiokastritsa, which dates from 1225, houses a museum. It is especially known for its great cliffs and nearby beaches.

== Administrative history ==
Palaiokastrites was a former municipality on the island of Corfu, Ionian Islands, Greece. Its including area was defined around the original village of Palaiokastritsa. Since the 2019 local government reform Palaiokastrites is part of the municipality of Central Corfu and Diapontia Islands as a smaller municipal unit. It has a land area of 48.379 km² and a population of 3,389 (2021 census). It is located on the west coast of Corfu just south of Angelokastro. The seat of the formerly independent Palaiokastriton municipality was the town of Lakones.

== Subdivisions ==
The municipal unit Palaiokastriton is subdivided into the following communities (constituent villages in brackets):

- Lakones (Lakones, Palaiokastritsa)
- Aleimmatades (Aleimmatades, Agia Anna)
- Gardelades
- Doukades (Doukades, Papathanatika)
- Krini
- Liapades (Liapades, Gefyra)
- Makrades (Makrades, Vistonas)
- Skripero (Skripero, Felekas)

== Gallery ==
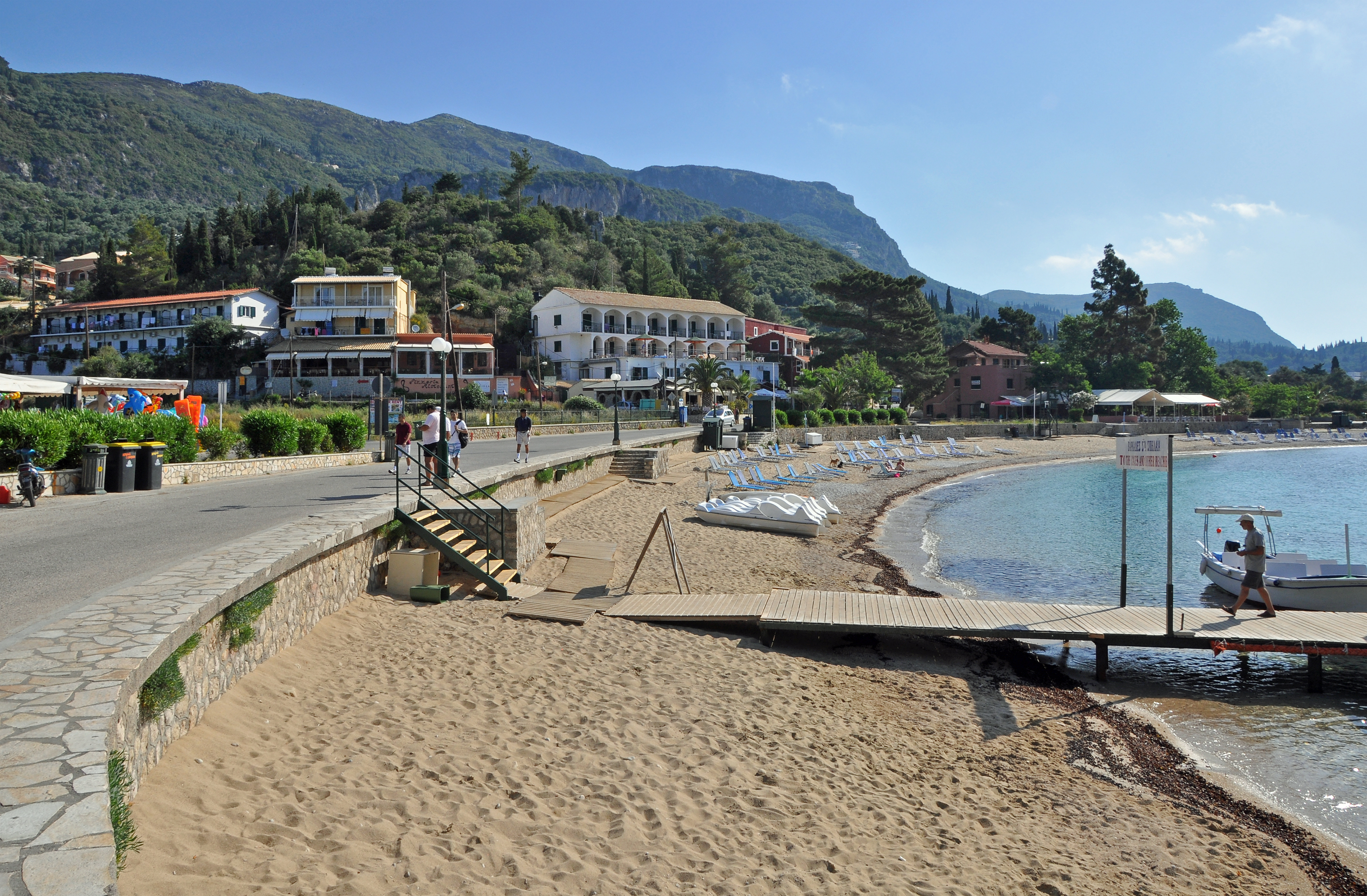
Main beach

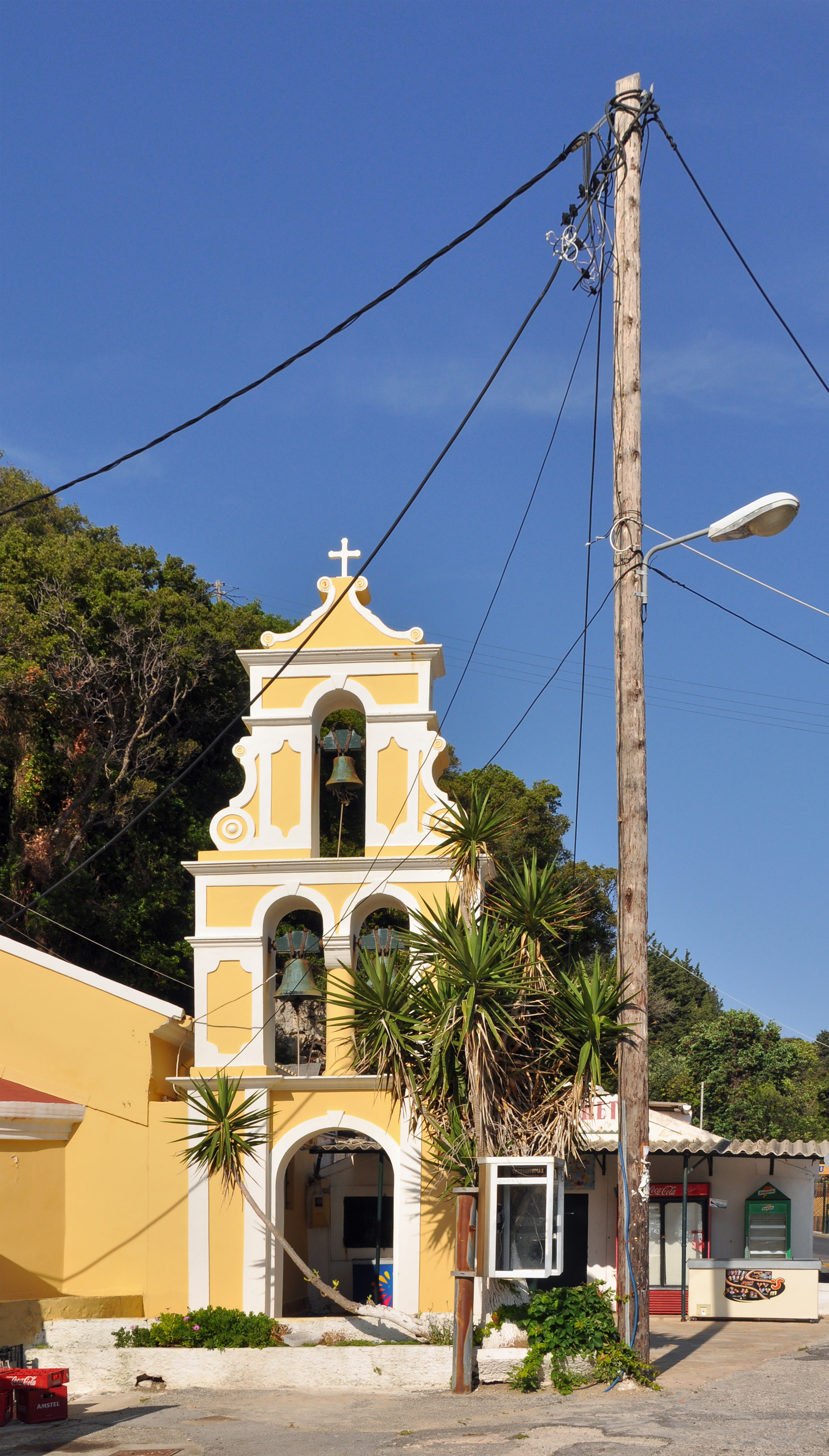
Church of St. Spyridon near the main beach

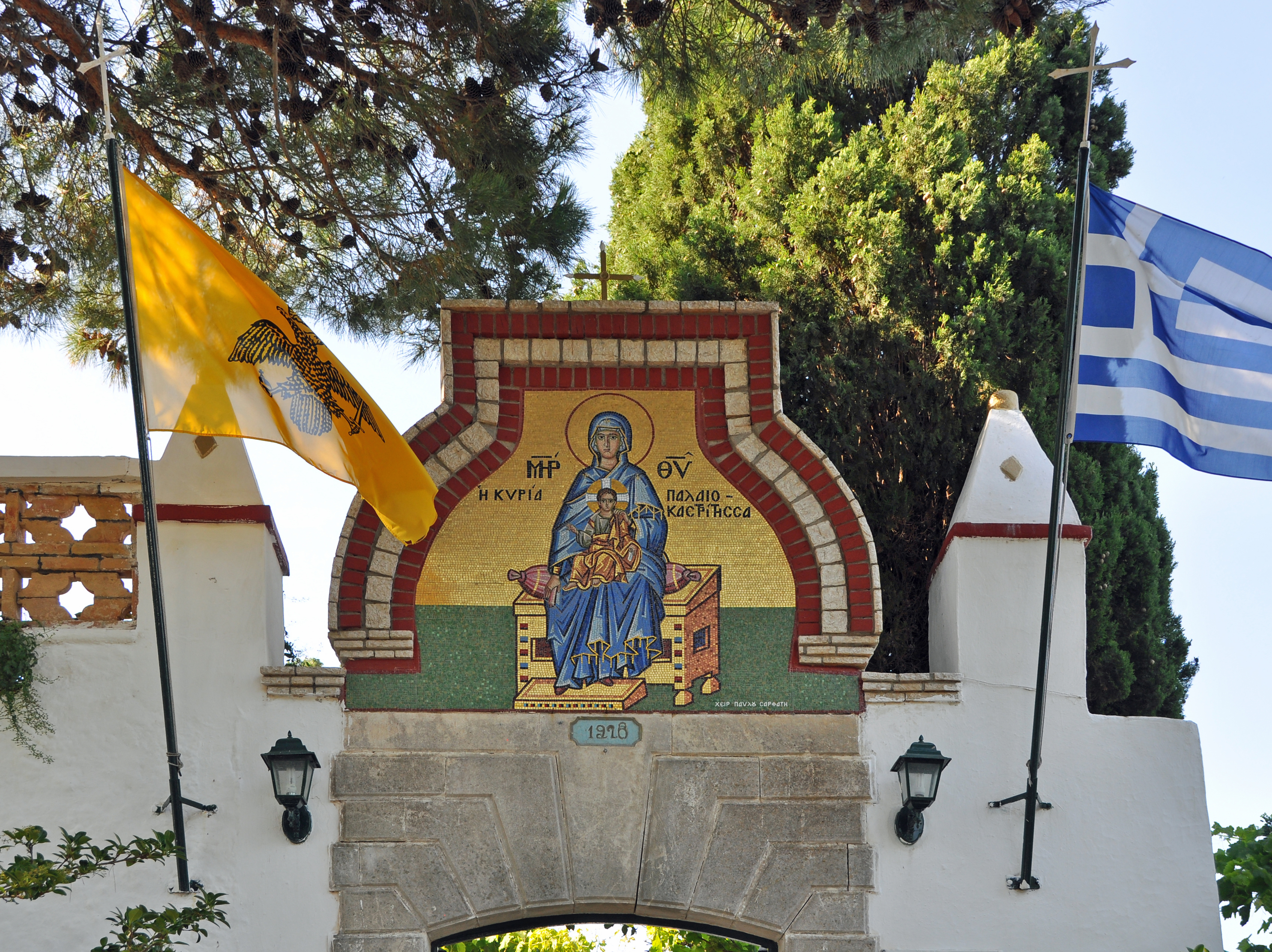
Monastery: entrance

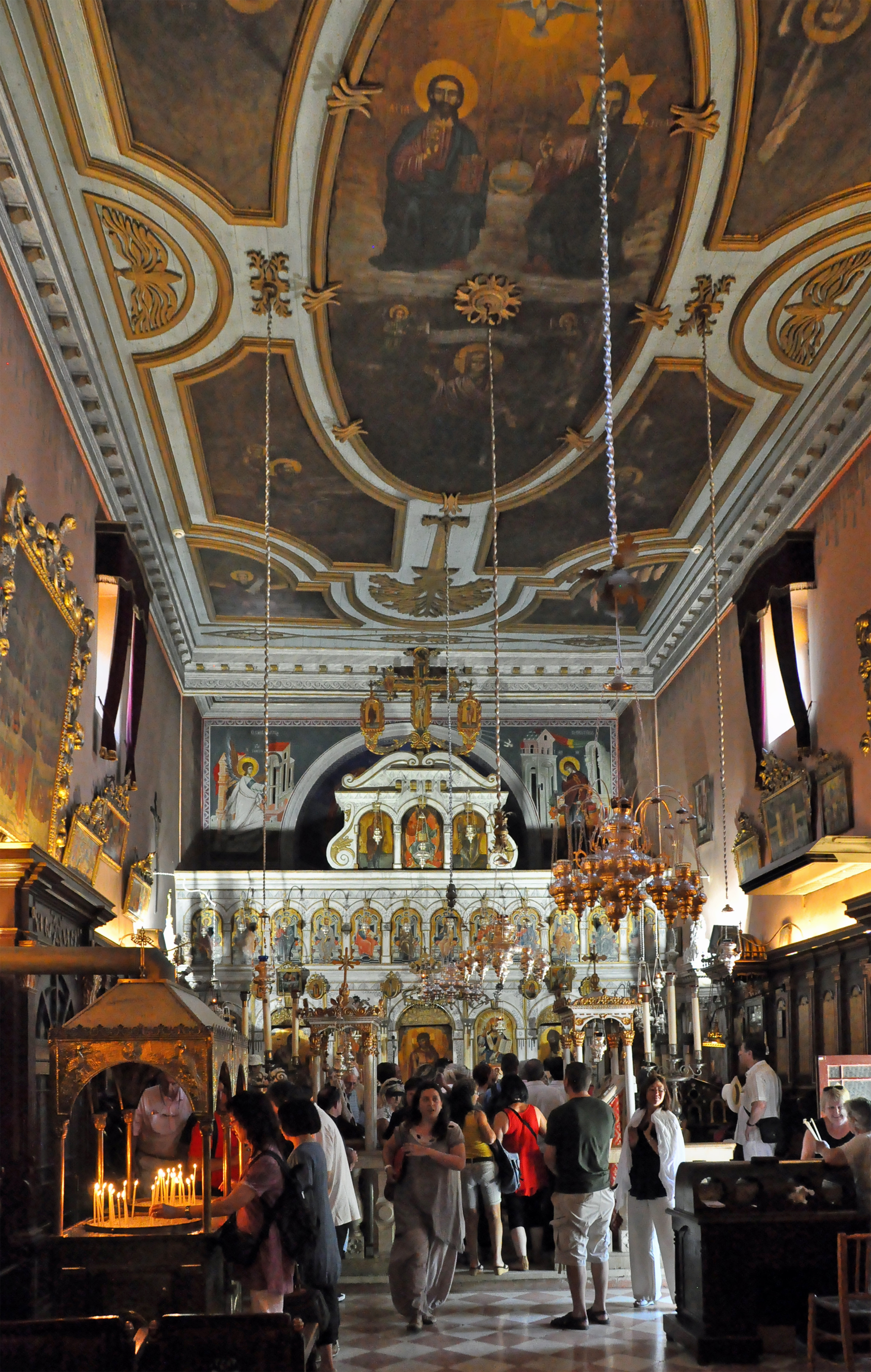
Monastery: inside the church

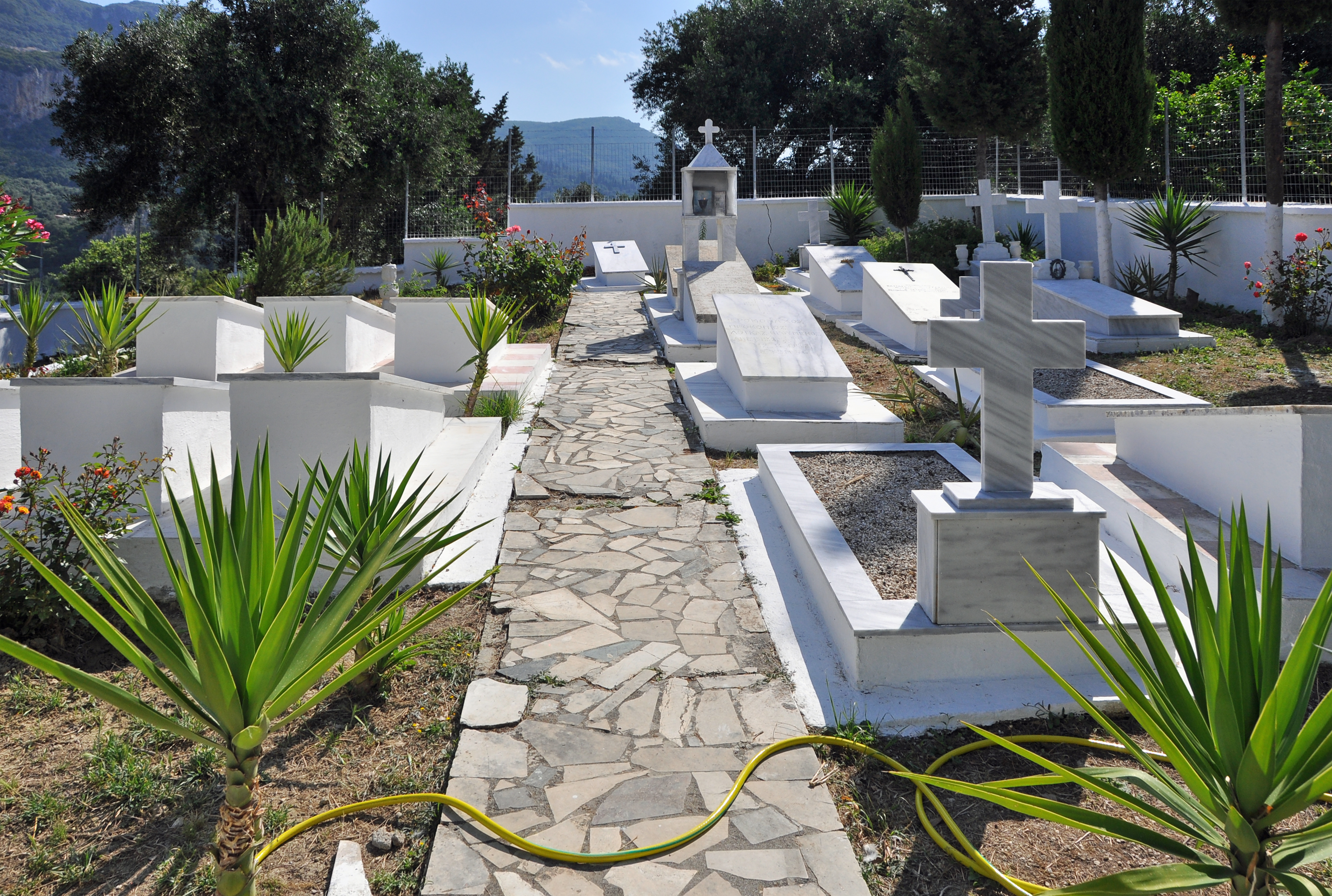
Monastery: graveyard

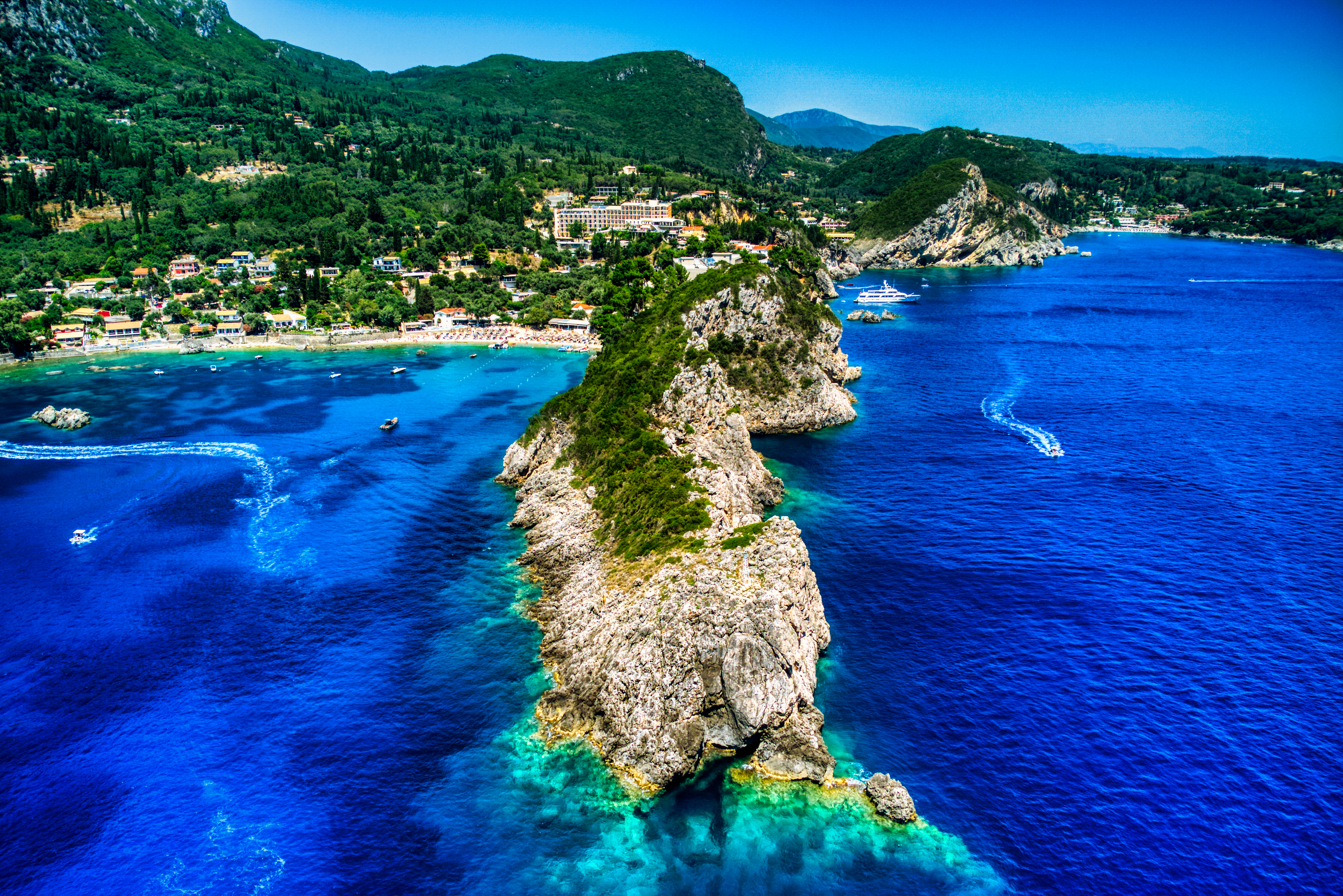
Paleokastritsa bay
