= Metallinos =

Metallinos is a Greek name and may refer to:

- Sculptor Aristedes Metallinos
- Protopresbyter (Archpriest) Fr. George Metallinos
