= Alepou =

Alepou Αλεπού
- Community
- Location within Greece
- Coordinates: 39°37′00″N 19°53′50″E
- Country: Greece
- Administrative region: Ionian Islands
- Regional unit: Corfu
- Municipality: Central Corfu and Diapontian Islands
- Municipal unit: Corfu (city)

Population (2021)
  - Community: 4,171
- Time zone: UTC+2 (EET)
  - Summer (DST): UTC+3 (EEST)

Alepou is a Greek town adjacent to the city of Corfu. Alepou was established as a settlement on 28 January 1866 by publication of the decision in the Greek government gazette. On 4 December 1997, it became part of the City of Corfu. In 2019, it was removed from the administrative unit of the municipality of Corfu, and transferred to the municipality of Central Corfu and Diapontia Islands. In 2021, the population of Alepou was 4,171.
