= Nisaki =

Nisaki Νησάκι
- Community
- Location within Greece
- Coordinates: 39°44′N 19°54′E
- Country: Greece
- Administrative region: Ionian Islands
- Regional unit: Corfu
- Municipality: North Corfu
- Municipal unit: Kassopaia

Population (2021)
  - Community: 329
- Time zone: UTC+2 (EET)
  - Summer (DST): UTC+3 (EEST)
- Vehicle registration: ΚΥ

Nisaki (Greek: Νησάκι meaning "little island") is a small sea-side community and port in north-east Corfu, Greece. It was named after the small island in its bay. During the 20th century, probably with the advent of mass tourism, several tavernas were built on this islet and a jetty was constructed, linking it permanently to the mainland. The main village of Nisaki grew up on the hill above this inlet where a church, school, cafe and many other buildings are located.

== Settlements ==
- Nisaki
- Apolysoi
- Vinglatouri
- Katavolos

== Population ==
Year	Settlement population	Community population
1981	-	507
1991	142	-
2001	346	592
2011	278	370
2021	220	329

== See also ==
- List of settlements in the Corfu regional unit
