= Faiakes =

Faiakes Φαίακες
- Municipal unit
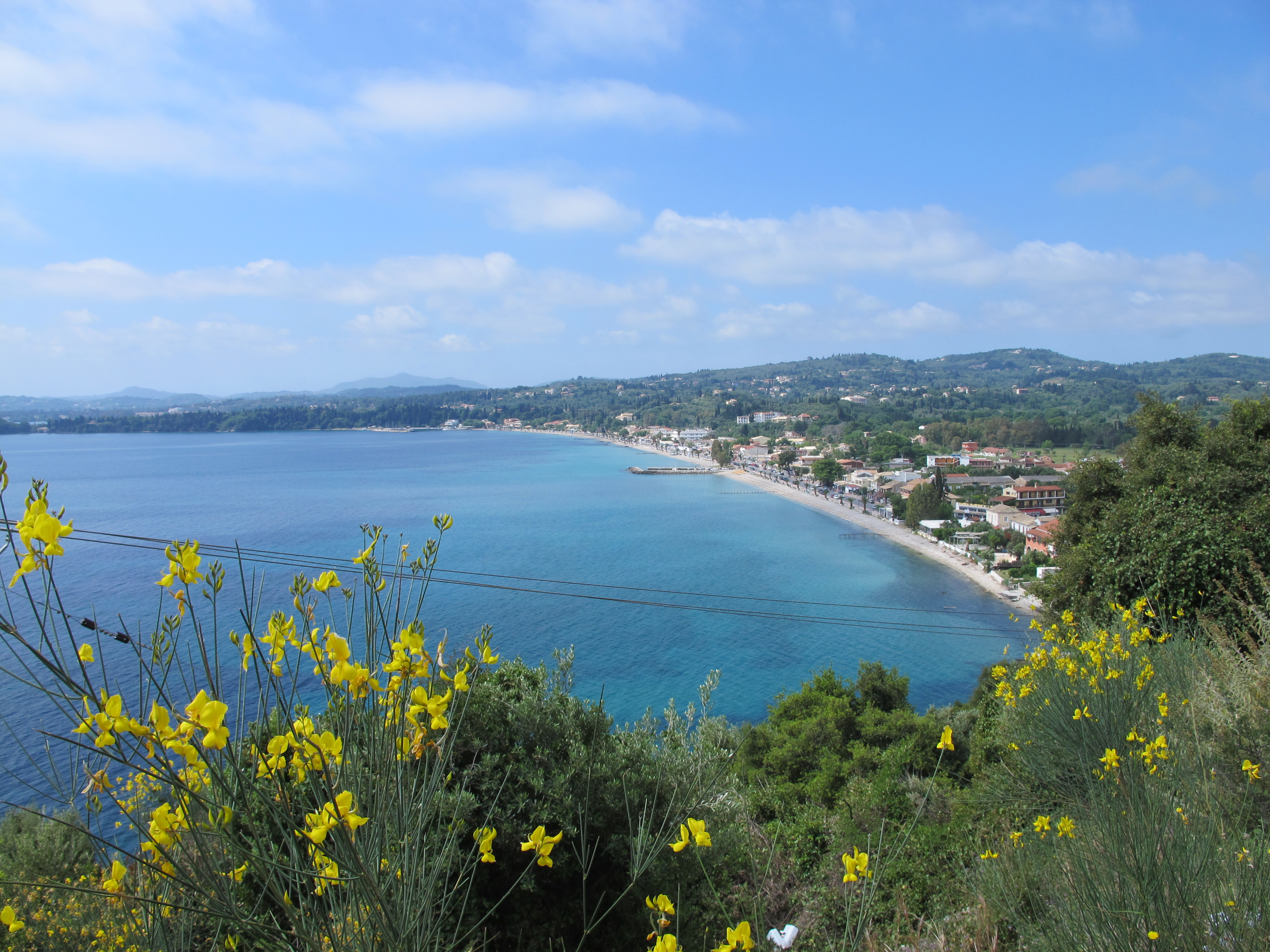
- Ipsos

- Location within the regional unit

- Location within Greece
- Coordinates: 39°42′N 19°49′E
- Country: Greece
- Administrative region: Ionian Islands
- Regional unit: Corfu
- Municipality: Central Corfu and Diapontia Islands

Area
  - Municipal unit: 53.9 km^{2} (20.8 sq mi)

Population (2021)
  - Municipal unit: 5,784
  - Municipal unit density: 107/km^{2} (278/sq mi)
- Time zone: UTC+2 (EET)
  - Summer (DST): UTC+3 (EEST)
- Vehicle registration: ΚΥ

Faiakes (Greek: Φαίακες) is a former municipality on the island of Corfu, Ionian Islands, Greece. Since the 2019 local government reform it is part of the municipality Central Corfu and Diapontia Islands, of which it is a municipal unit. It is located in the northeastern part of the island of Corfu. It has a land area of 53.850 km^{2} and a population of 5,784 (2021 census). The seat of the municipality was the village Ipsos. The municipal unit consists of the communities Agios Markos, Ano Korakiana, Kato Korakiana (incl. Ipsos), Sgourades, Sokraki, Spartylas and Zygos.
