= Sgourades =

Sgourades Σγουράδες
- Community
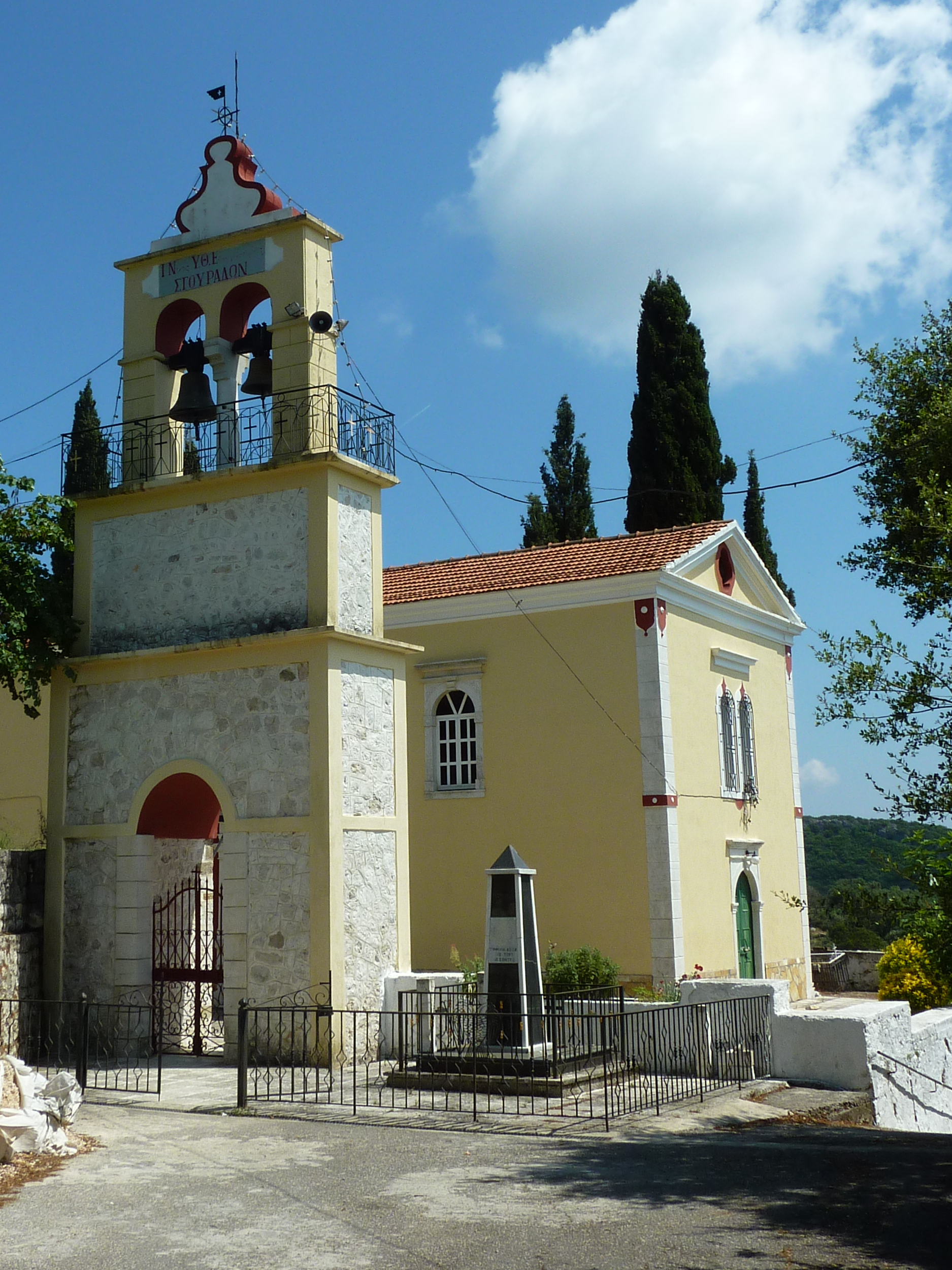
- Church near Sgourades

- Location within Greece
- Country: Greece
- Administrative region: Ionian Islands
- Regional unit: Corfu
- Municipality: Central Corfu and Diapontian Islands
- Municipal unit: Faiakes

Population (2021)
  - Community: 165
- Time zone: UTC+2 (EET)
  - Summer (DST): UTC+3 (EEST)

Sgourades (Greek: Σγουράδες) is a Greek village on the island of Corfu. In the 2021 census, the community of Sgourades, which also includes the village of Omali, had 165 inhabitants.
