= Zygos, Corfu =

Zygos Ζυγός
- Community
- Location within Greece
- Country: Greece
- Administrative region: Ionian Islands
- Regional unit: Corfu
- Municipality: Central Corfu and Diapontian Islands
- Municipal unit: Faiakes

Population (2021)
  - Community: 137
- Time zone: UTC+2 (EET)
  - Summer (DST): UTC+3 (EEST)

Zygos (Greek: Ζυγός) is a Greek village on the island of Corfu. In the 2021 census, it had 137 inhabitants.
