= Krini, Corfu =

Krini Κρήνη
- Community
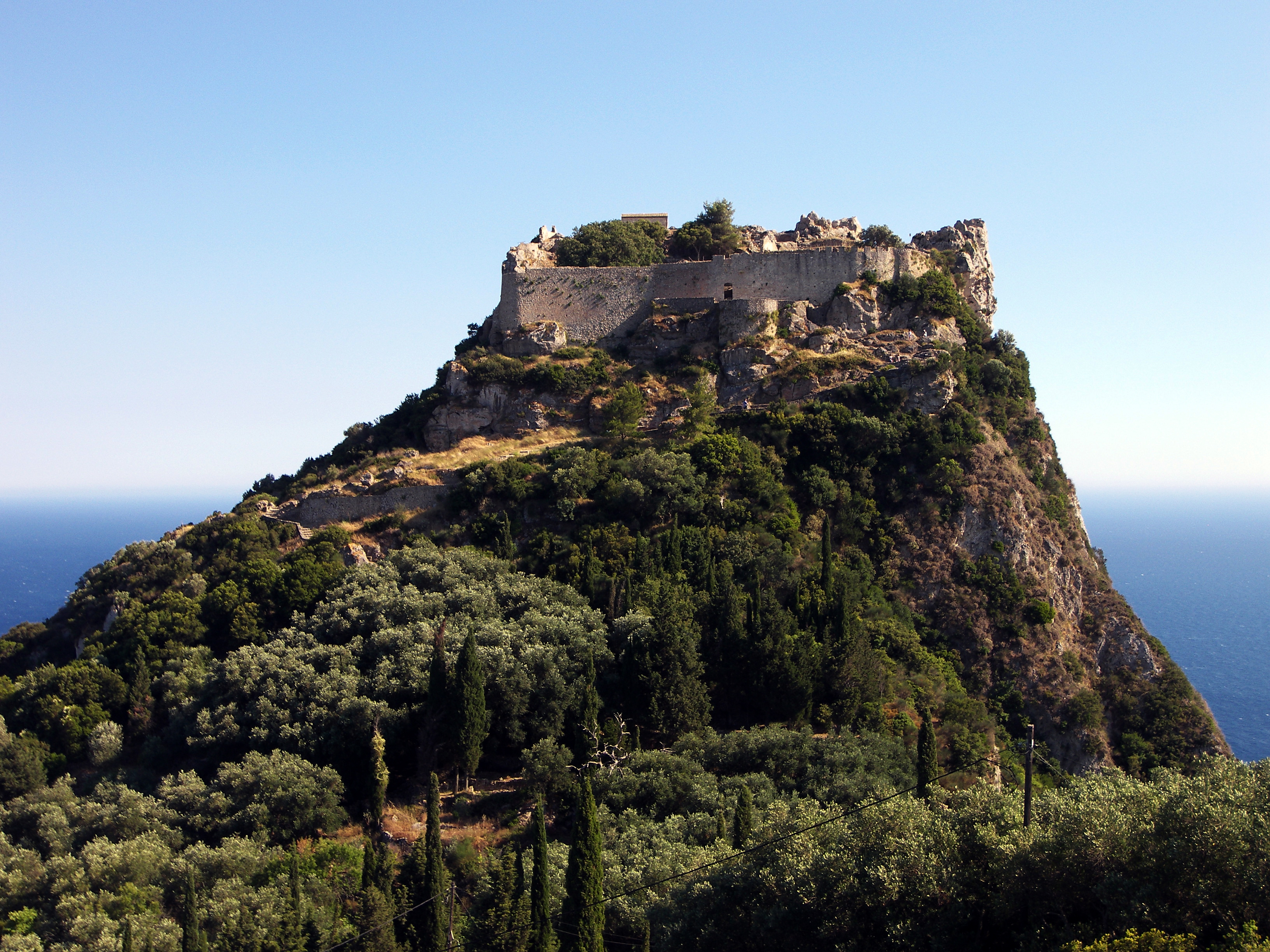
- View of Angelokastro from Krini

- Location within Greece
- Coordinates: 39°41′06″N 19°41′10″E
- Country: Greece
- Administrative region: Ionian Islands
- Regional unit: Corfu
- Municipality: Central Corfu and Diapontia Islands
- Municipal unit: Palaiokastritsa
- Elevation: 310 m (1,020 ft)

Population (2021)
  - Community: 276
- Time zone: UTC+2 (EET)
  - Summer (DST): UTC+3 (EEST)
- Postal code: 49083
- Area code: 26630

Krini (Greek: Κρήνη) is a small village on the island of Corfu. The Castle of Angelokastro is located at the top of the highest peak of the island's shoreline.
