= Spartylas =

Coordinates: 39°43′10″N 19°50′41″E

Spartylas Σπαρτύλας
- Community
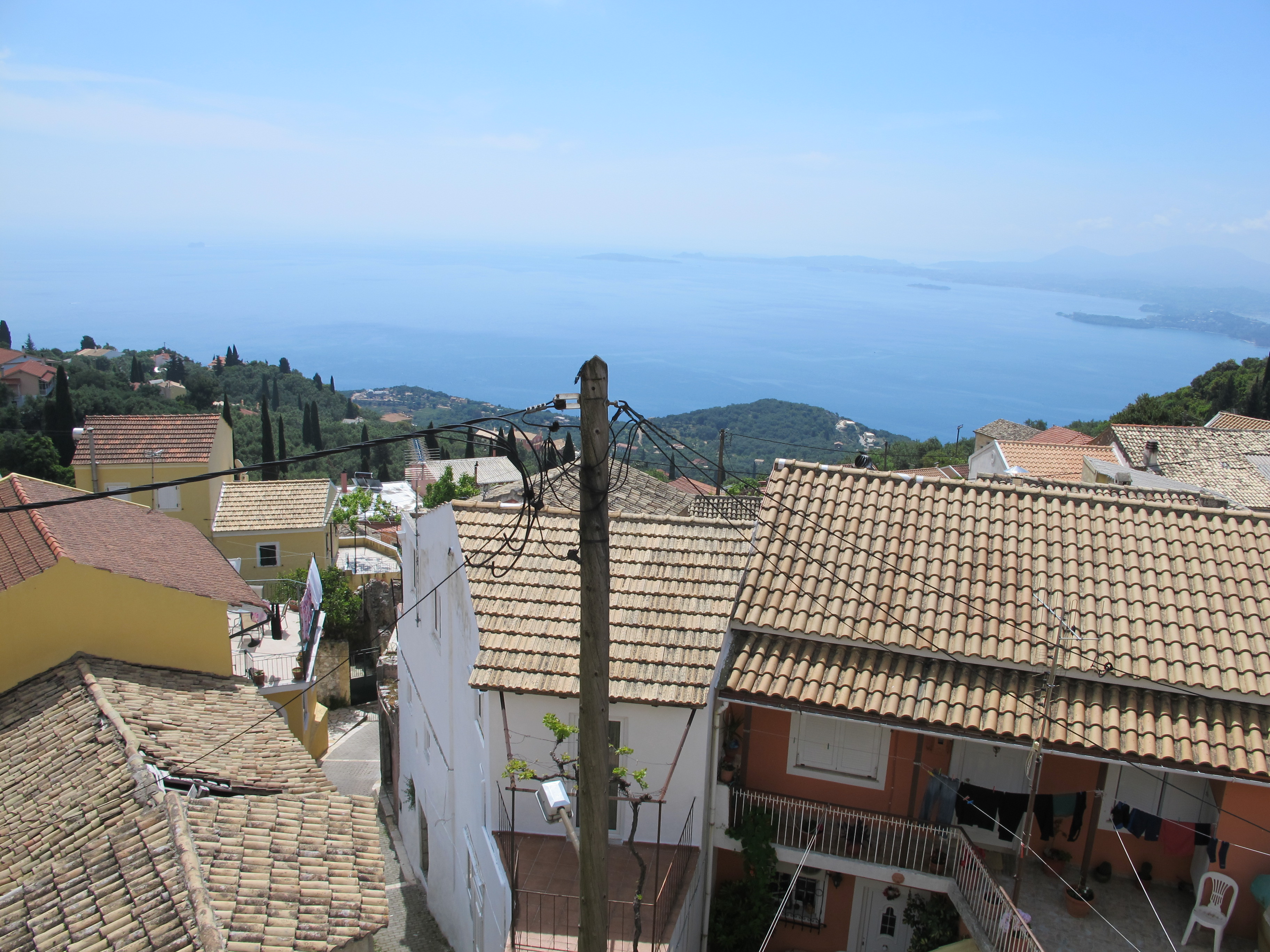
- Spartylas
- Interactive map of Spartylas
- Country: Greece
- Administrative region: Ionian Islands
- Regional unit: Corfu
- Municipality: Central Corfu and Diapontian Islands
- Municipal unit: Faiakes

Population (2021)
  - Community: 762
- Time zone: UTC+2 (EET)
  - Summer (DST): UTC+3 (EEST)

Spartylas (Greek: Σπαρτύλας) is a Greek village on the island of Corfu. In the 2021 census, the community of Spartylas, which also includes the villages of Barbati and Pyrgi, had 762 inhabitants.
