= Kato Korakiana =

Kato Korakiana Κάτω Κορακιάνα
- Community
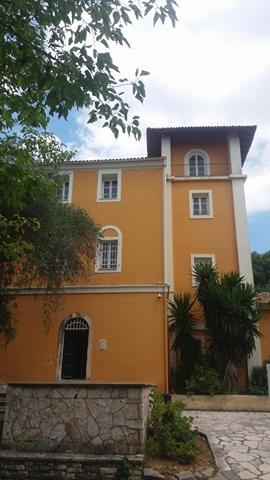
- Annex of the National Gallery in Kato Korakiana

- Location within Greece
- Country: Greece
- Administrative region: Ionian Islands
- Regional unit: Corfu
- Municipality: Central Corfu and Diapontian Islands
- Municipal unit: Faiakes

Population (2021)
  - Community: 2,507
- Time zone: UTC+2 (EET)
  - Summer (DST): UTC+3 (EEST)

Kato Korakiana (Greek: Κάτω Κορακιάνα) is a Greek village on the island of Corfu.

== Overview ==
The village hosts a branch of the National Gallery.

The poet Lorentzos Mavilis and the botanist Sidney Merlin both resided in the village.
