= Aristeidis Metallinos =

Greek sculptor

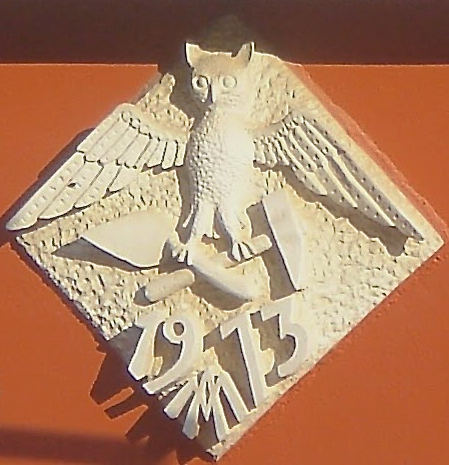
Stone relief by Aristeidis Metallinos - on the front of the museum he built to display his art

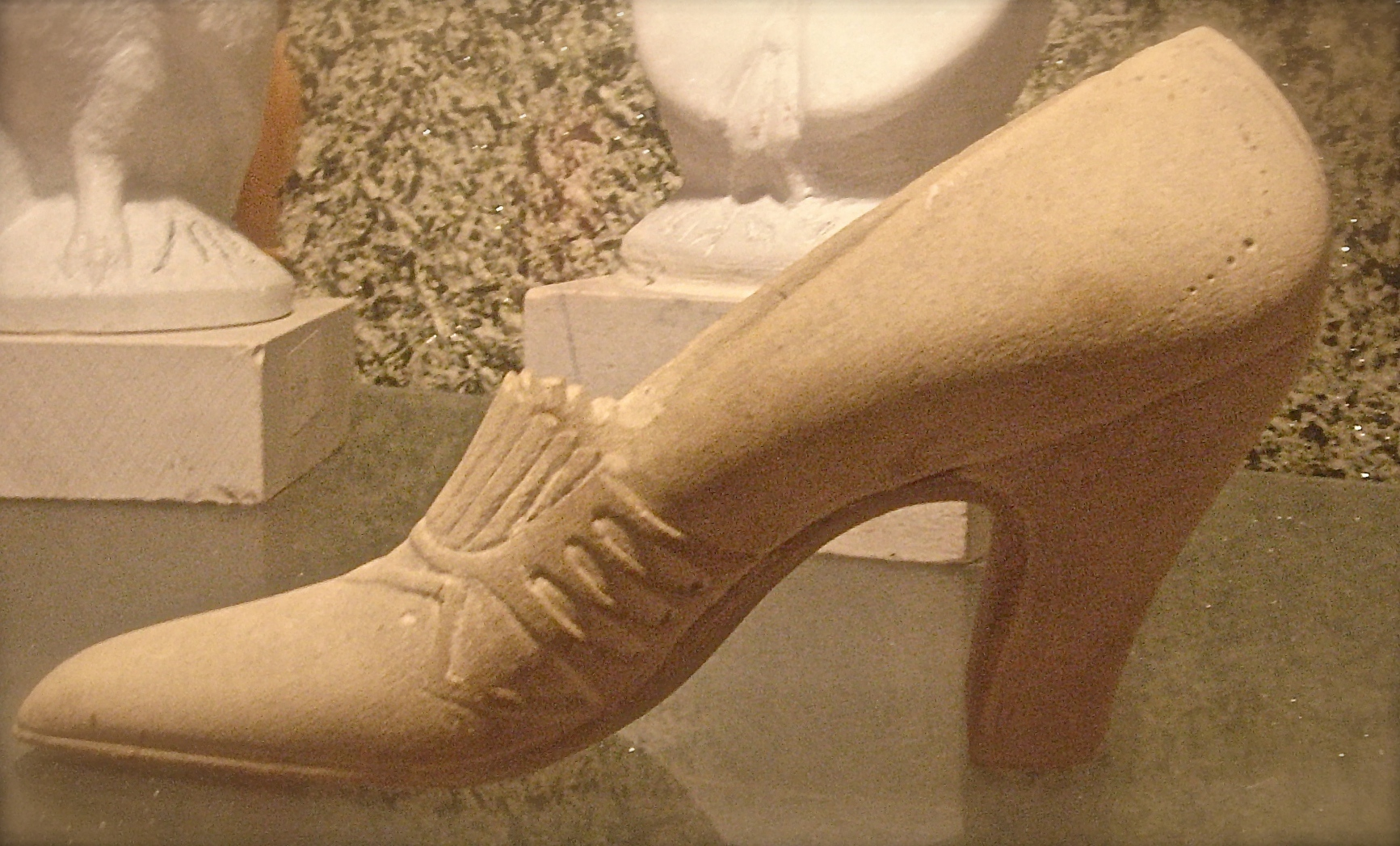
Shoe, 1928. Metallinos' first work, a carving in local stone by the sculptor when he was 20.

Aristeidis Metallinos (Greek: Αριστείδης Μεταλληνός; (c. 1908 – 19 May 1987) was a Greek sculptor.

There is no official record of Metallinos' birth date; he was one of three sons of Zacharias and Eleni Metallinos.

Except for one carving in stone of a woman's shoe when he was 20, Metallinos spent the greatest part of his life working as a shoemaker, stonemason, builder and general craftsman in the village of Ano Korakiana on the island of Corfu in Greece. Despite early evidence of his imaginative talent as a carver of stone, Metallinos was prevented by poverty from artistic training. He did not begin his work as a self-taught sculptor until 1973, when at the age of 67 until his death in 1987, he fulfilled a long-held intention of using hammer and chisel 'to bear witness to human nature and its weaknesses' «να παρουσιάσω τον άνθρωπο και τα ελαττώματά του». The Scops owl Metallinos carved on a stone plaque fixed to the front of his house, displaying his initials, and holding a builder's trowel and a sculptor's hammer, is dated the year he made the transition from builder to sculptor, depicting in stone and marble a unique record of a fast changing pastoral economy, emphasising the primacy of the family, village institutions and traditional customs, yet mingling with this account of Greek folklore, works that are erotic, ribald and subversively political.

His work of over 250 pieces, nearly all completed in the last 12 years of his life, is kept together in a family museum in Ano Korakiana - a museum he built himself, intending it as a gift to the village.

Metallinos' first wife, Eleni, died childless. He was married again, late in life, to Angeliki, who bore him two children, Andreas and Maria. He died at the age of 79 on 19 May 1987. Andreas died in October 2016. His wife Anna continues to live in Ano Korakiana in the museum that houses a unique collection of work largely unknown outside the village in which it was created.

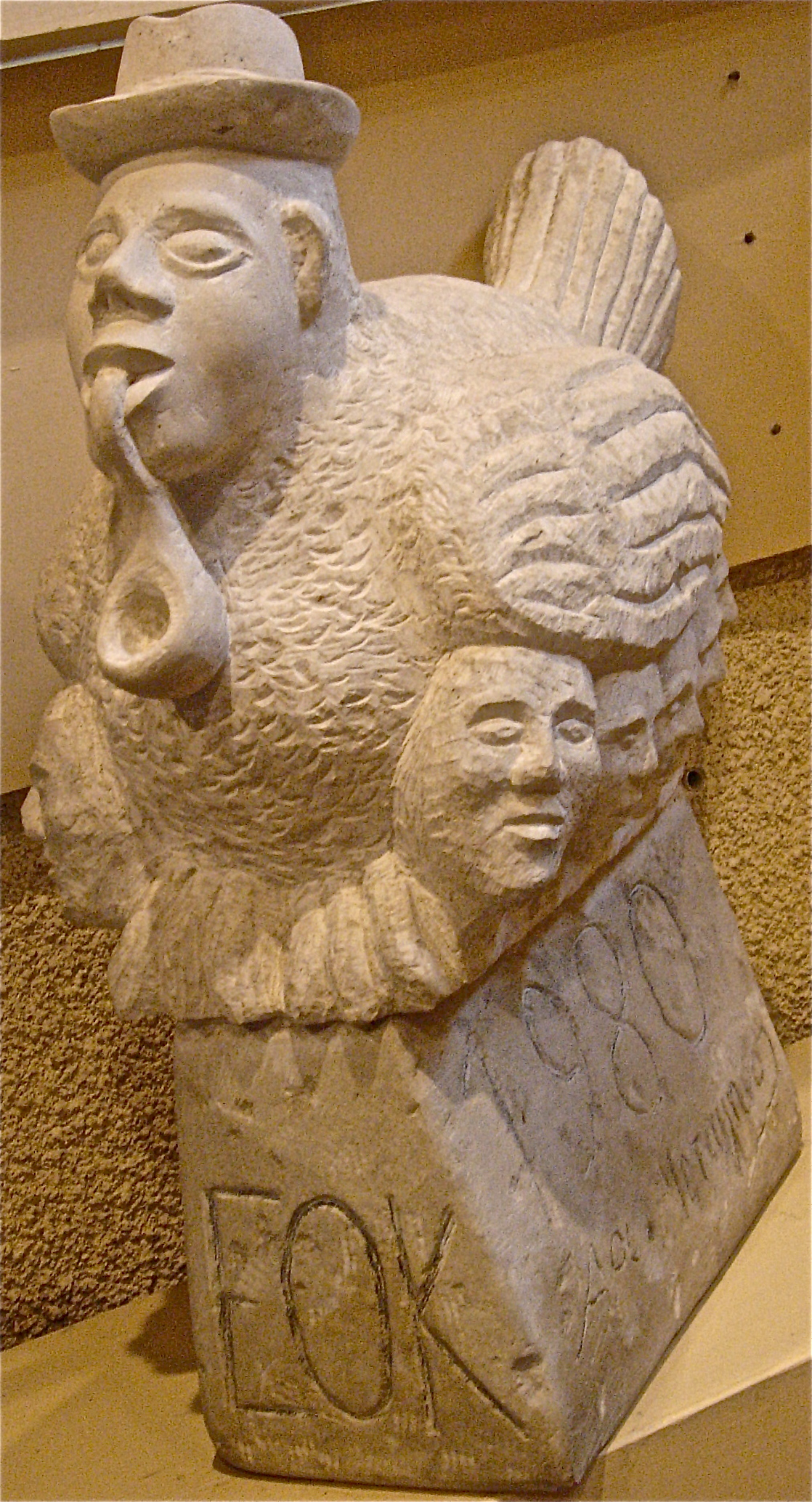
ΕΟΚ (Ευρωπαϊκή Οικονομική Κοινότητα) 1980. The EEC as a broody Chimaera

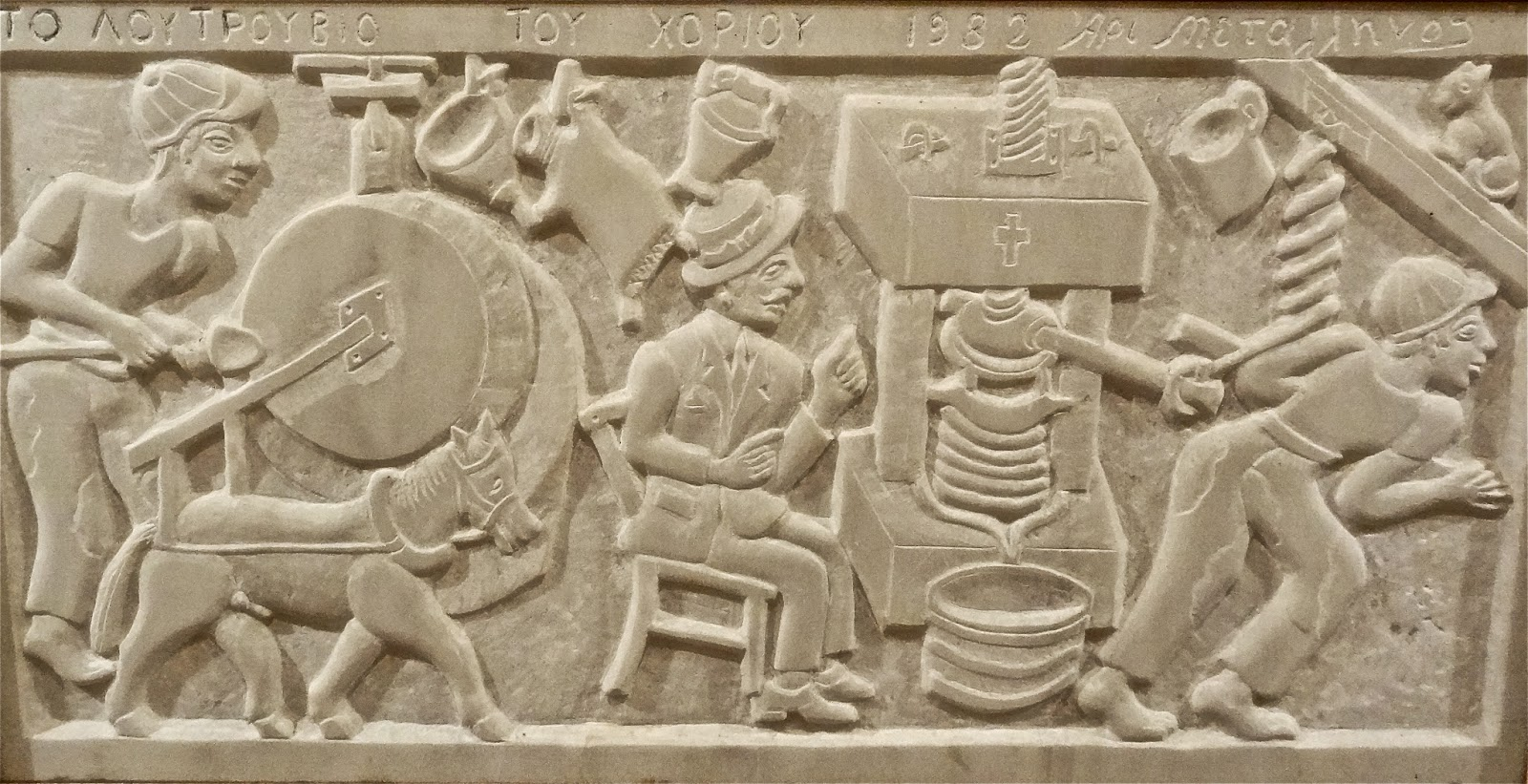
Village olive-oil press, 1982
