= Citizens Service Centres =

Citizens' Service Centres
- Κέντρα Εξυπηρέτησης Πολιτών
- Abbreviation: KEP (Greek: ΚΕΠ)
- Predecessor: Citizens' Offices
- Formation: 2002
- Legal status: public
- Location: Greece
- Region served: Greece
- Official language: Greek
- Parent organization: Ministry of Digital Governance
- Website: www.kep.gov.gr

Citizens' Service Centres (Greek: Κέντρα Εξυπηρέτησης Πολιτών, romanized: Kéntra Exypīrétīsīs Politṓn, ΚΕΠ; KEPs) are state offices established by article 31 of law 3013/2002 (Government Gazette 102 A'/01-05-2002), initially in the Prefectures' capitals (Headquarters), in order to reduce bureaucracy and faster service to citizens in terms of their transactions with the state. The role of Citizens' Service Centres is to be the contact points of the Public Services with the citizens and to provide one-stop services.

== History ==
Predecessor of Citizens' Service Centres were the Citizens' Offices (Γραφεία των Πολιτών). The digital platform, MyKEPlive, of the KEPs, enabling the citizens to conduct transactions with the Greek state online, was presented in 2020.

Citizens and businesses have the ability to reserve a priority number for service with physical presence in KEPs in the country. This is the KEP-ePass, which is available through platform Rabtevou KEP (rantevou.kep.gov.gr) and aims to provide faster, simpler and better service from Citizen Service Centres. Each citizen can also have its own digital box (inbox) where the certificates and documents they have requested from the KEPs will be directly digitally registered. The Single Social Security Entity (EFKA), or e-EFKA, digital services are also provided through the KEPs.

== Services ==
Some of the 2,000 services provided are the following:

- Certificate of authenticity of the signature, made in the personal presence of the citizen carrying with them an identification document (identity card, passport, driver's license or Medical booklet).
- Certificate of exact copy for public or private documents that have been certified by a lawyer (valid only in the case of documents intended for use in companies or private organizations as public documents do not need certification for use in the public sector, according to law 4250/2014, Government Gazette 74 A’/26-03-2014).
- Physical identification of the citizen and the civil servant for the issuance of personal digital authentication signature and encryption certificates.
- Transfer the ownership of a private vehicle. Transfer of a registration licence for a numbered passenger car or motorcycle for private use. The procedure concerns the transfer of ownership of private use passenger vehicles and is available to citizens and legal persons.
- Obtain an electronic signature from the Hellenic Public Administration Certification Authority.
- Discontinue your conscription postponement (for students and pupils).
- Social security clearance certificate (for natural or legal persons).
- Printing a monthly or annual pensioner's information note.
- Issue of a European Health Insurance Card (EHIC).
- Issue an e-Apostille (Apostille Convention).
- Civil partnership registration certificate.
- Issue of pension statement for tax use.
- Certificate of contributions for tax use.
- Single Judicial Solvency Certificate.
- Copy of higher education degrees.
- Renew your unemployment card.
- University studentship certificate.
- Marriage registration certificate.
- Academic transcript certificate.
- Declare the baptism of a child.
- Proof of insurance coverage.
- Death registration certificate.
- Copy of criminal record.
- Certificate of locality.
