= Central Corfu and Diapontian Islands =

Central Corfu and Diapontian Islands Κεντρική Κέρκυρα και Διαπόντια Νησιά
- Municipality
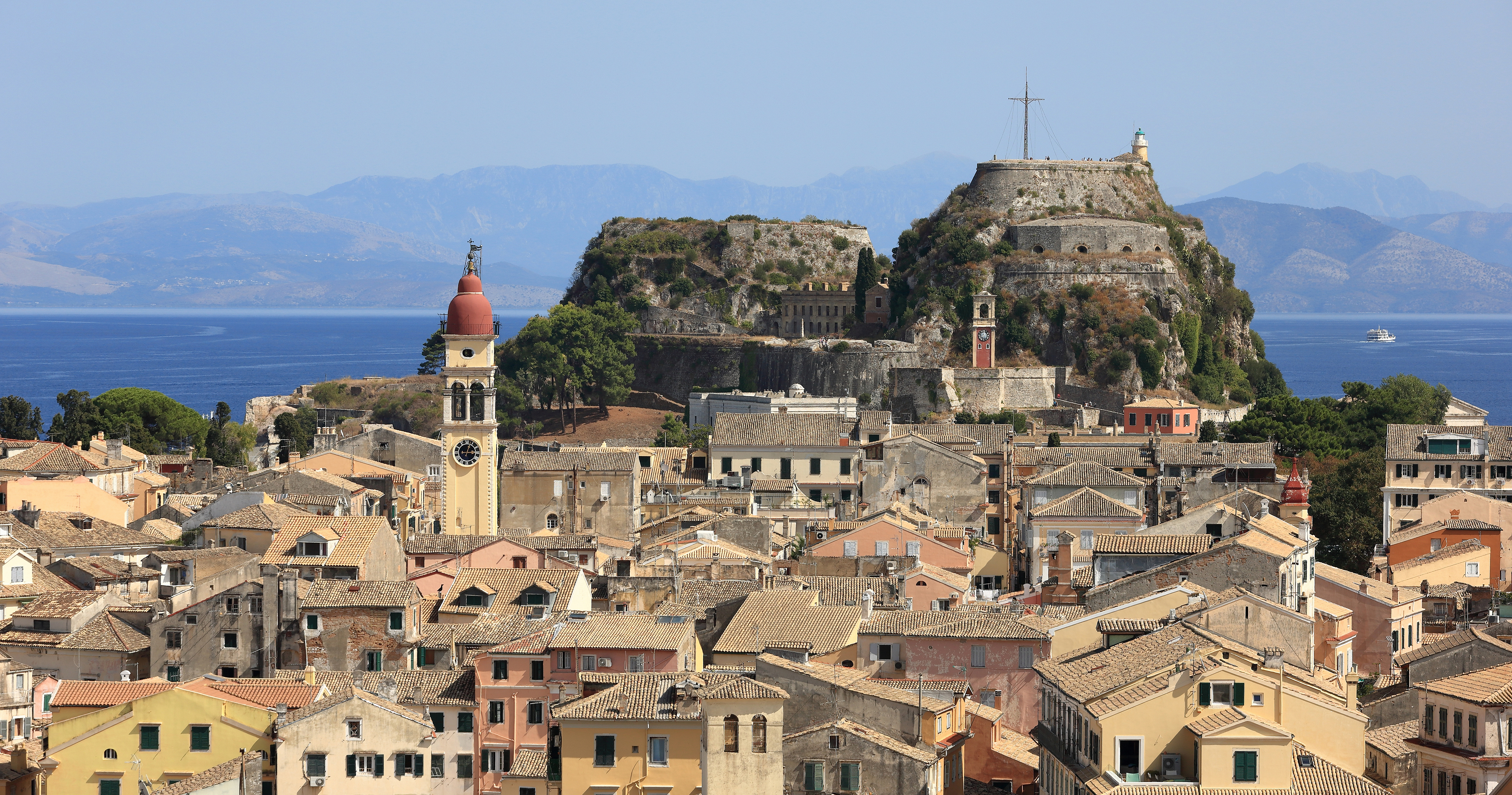

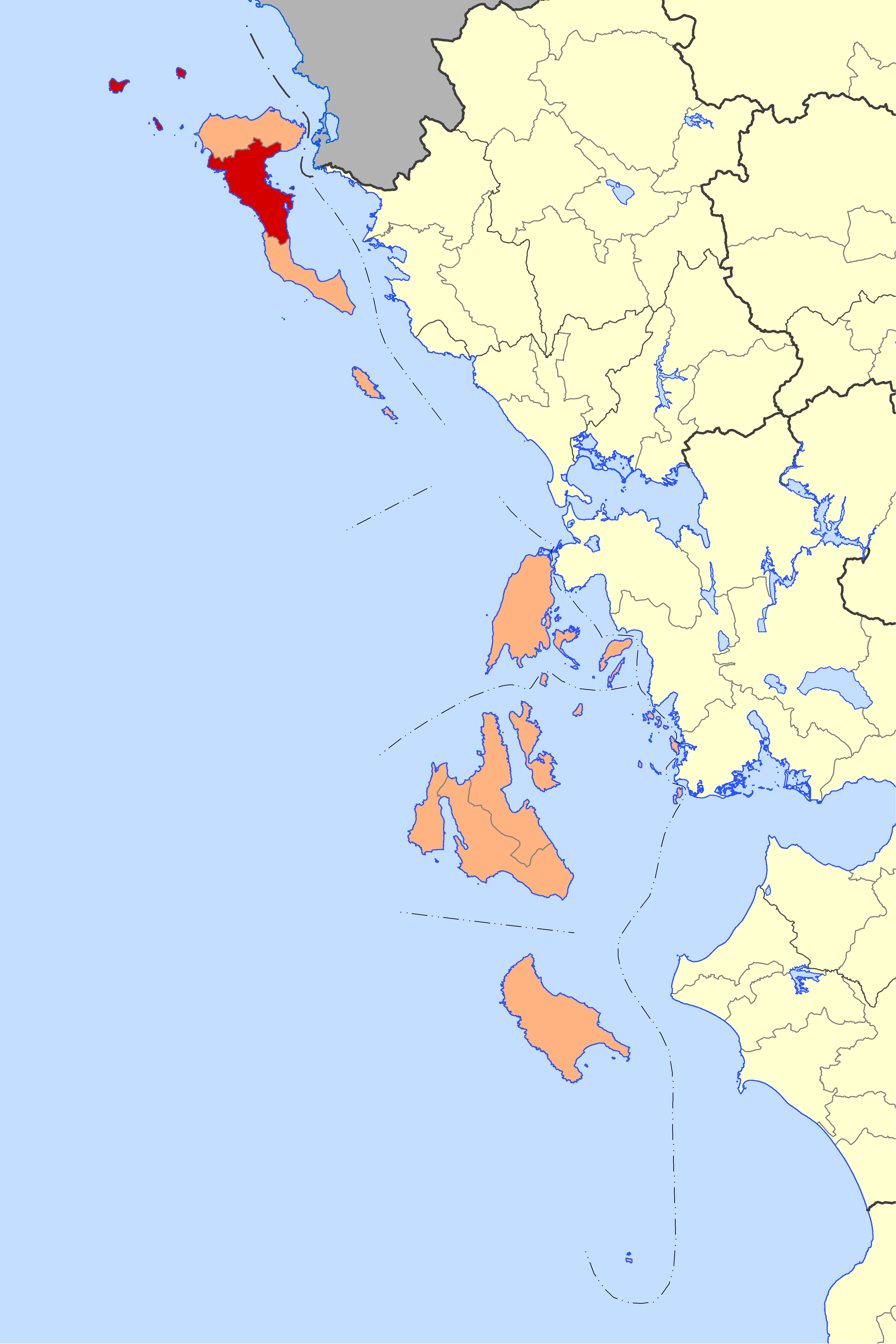

- Location within Greece
- Coordinates: 39°38′N 19°49′E
- Country: Greece
- Administrative region: Ionian Islands
- Regional unit: Corfu
- Seat: Corfu (city)

Government
  - Mayor: Stefanos Poulimenos (since 2023)

Area
  - Municipality: 259.5 km^{2} (100.2 sq mi)

Population (2021)
  - Municipality: 67,112
  - Density: 258.6/km^{2} (669.8/sq mi)
- Time zone: UTC+2 (EET)
  - Summer (DST): UTC+3 (EEST)
- Website: www.corfu.gr

Central Corfu and Diapontian Islands (Greek: Κεντρική Κέρκυρα και Διαπόντια Νησιά, Kentriki Kerkyra kai Diapontia Nisia) is a municipality in the Ionian Islands region in Greece. It covers the central part of the island of Corfu and the Diapontian Islands. The municipality was formed at the 2019 local government reform, when the pre-existing municipality of Corfu was divided in three. Its seat is the city Corfu.

The municipality consists of the following eight subdivisions (municipal units):

- Achilleio
- Corfu (city)
- Ereikoussa
- Faiakes
- Mathraki
- Othonoi
- Palaiokastritsa
- Parelioi
