= Corfu (regional unit) =

Corfu Περιφερειακή ενότητα Κερκύρας
- Regional unit
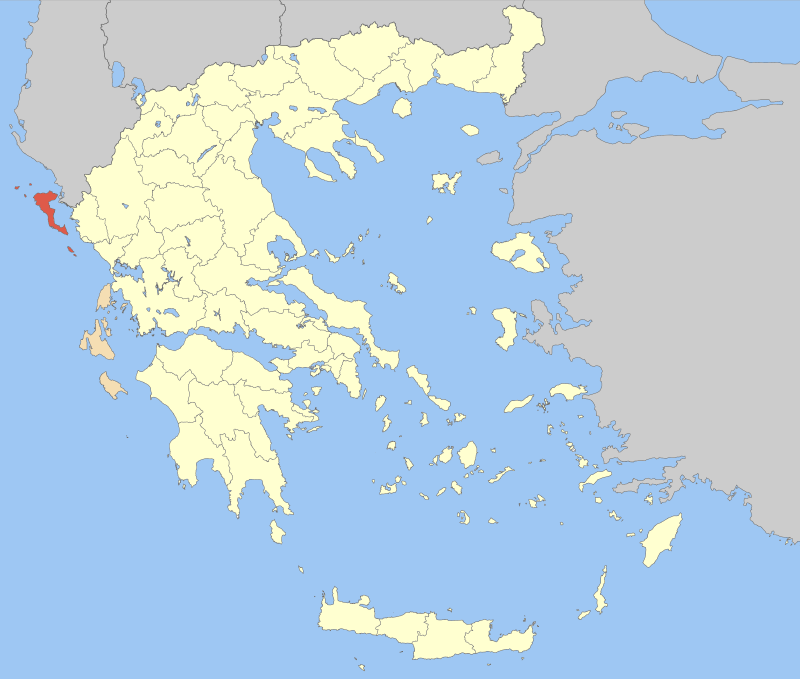
- Corfu within Greece

- Location within Greece
- Coordinates: 39°40′N 19°45′E
- Country: Greece
- Administrative region: Ionian Islands
- Seat: Corfu

Area
  - Total: 641.1 km^{2} (247.5 sq mi)

Population (2021)
  - Total: 101,600
  - Density: 158.5/km^{2} (410.5/sq mi)
- Time zone: UTC+2 (EET)
  - Summer (DST): UTC+3 (EEST)
- Postal code: 49x xx
- Area code: 266x0
- Vehicle registration: ΚΥ
- Website: www.kerkyra.gr

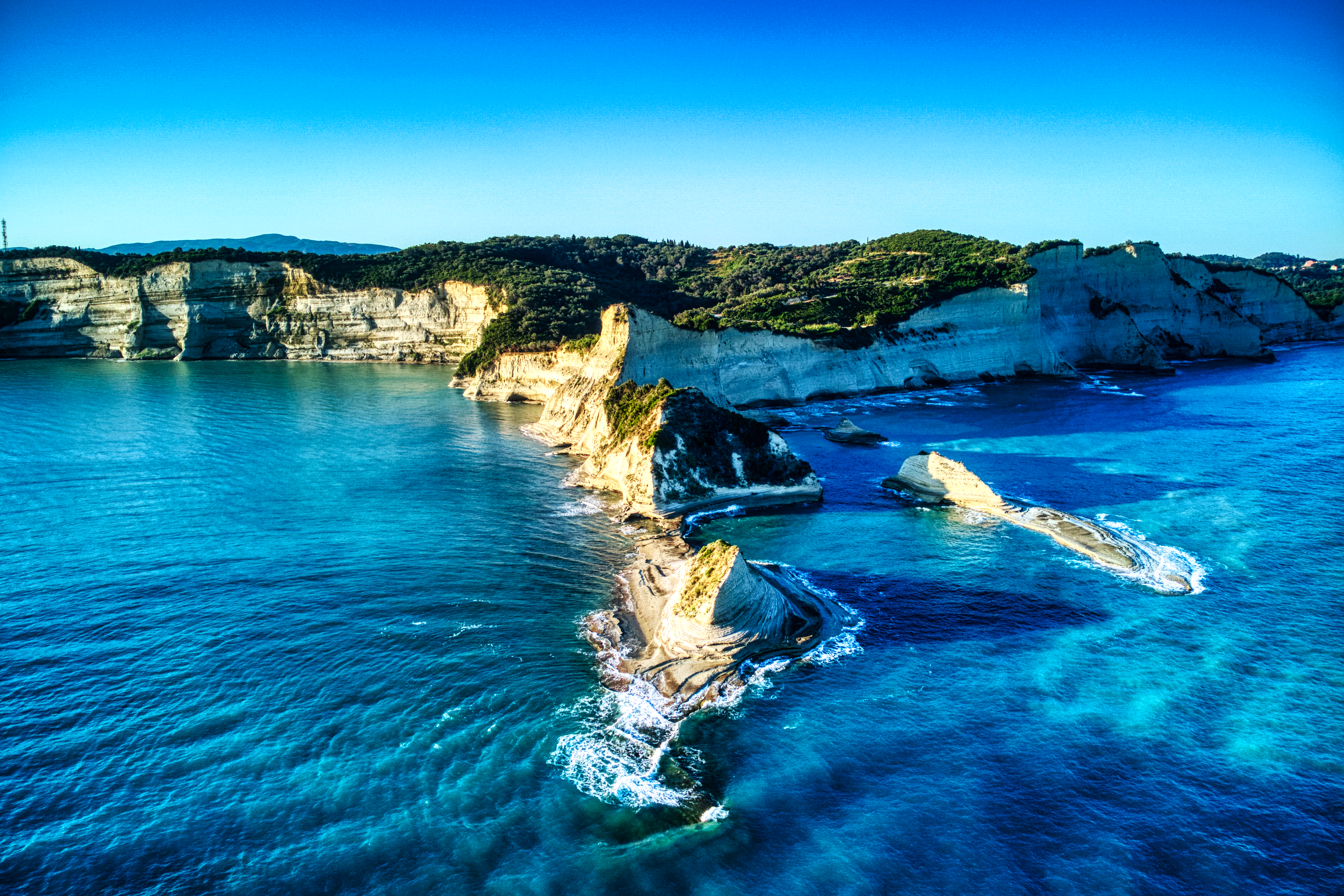
Cape Drastis

Corfu (Greek: Περιφερειακή ενότητα Κερκύρας) is one of the regional units of Greece. It is part of the region of the Ionian Islands. The capital of the regional unit is the town of Corfu. The regional unit consists of the islands of Corfu, Paxos, Othonoi, Ereikoussa, Mathraki and several smaller islands, all in the Ionian Sea.

== Administration ==
Since 2019, the regional unit Corfu is subdivided into four municipalities:

- Central Corfu and Diapontian Islands
- North Corfu
- Paxos
- South Corfu

=== Prefecture ===
As a part of the 2011 Kallikratis government reform, the regional unit Corfu was created out of the former prefecture of Corfu (Greek: Νομός Κερκύρας). The prefecture, created in 1864, had the same territory as the present regional unit; it was divided into the provinces of Corfu (capital Corfu city) and Paxos (capital Gaios)

== Population ==
Historical population
Year	Pop.	±%
1991	103,505	—
2001	111,081	+7.3%
2011	104,371	−6.0%
2021	101,600	−2.7%

== See also ==
- List of settlements in the Corfu regional unit
