= Agios Stefanos =

Agios Stefanos or Hagios Stephanos is Greek for Saint Stephen. It may refer to:

== Places in Greece ==
- Agios Stefanos, Saravali, a village in the municipality of Patras near close to Saravali
- Agios Stefanos, Achaea, a village in the municipality of West Achaea, also known as Peristera (Olenia)
- Agios Stefanos, Attica, a suburb of Athens
- Agios Stefanos, Crete, a village in the municipality Ierapetra
- Agios Stefanos, Laconia
- Agios Stefanos, Mykonos, a beach on the island Mykonos
- Agios Stefanos, Phthiotis
- Agios Stefanos, Thinali, a village in the municipal unit of Thinali, North-East Corfu
- Agios Stefanos Avliotes, a beach/village in the municipal unit of Esperies, North-West Corfu

== Other places ==
- The Greek name for Yeşilköy, a neighbourhood of Istanbul, Turkey
