= Nymfes =

Nymfes Νύμφες
- Community
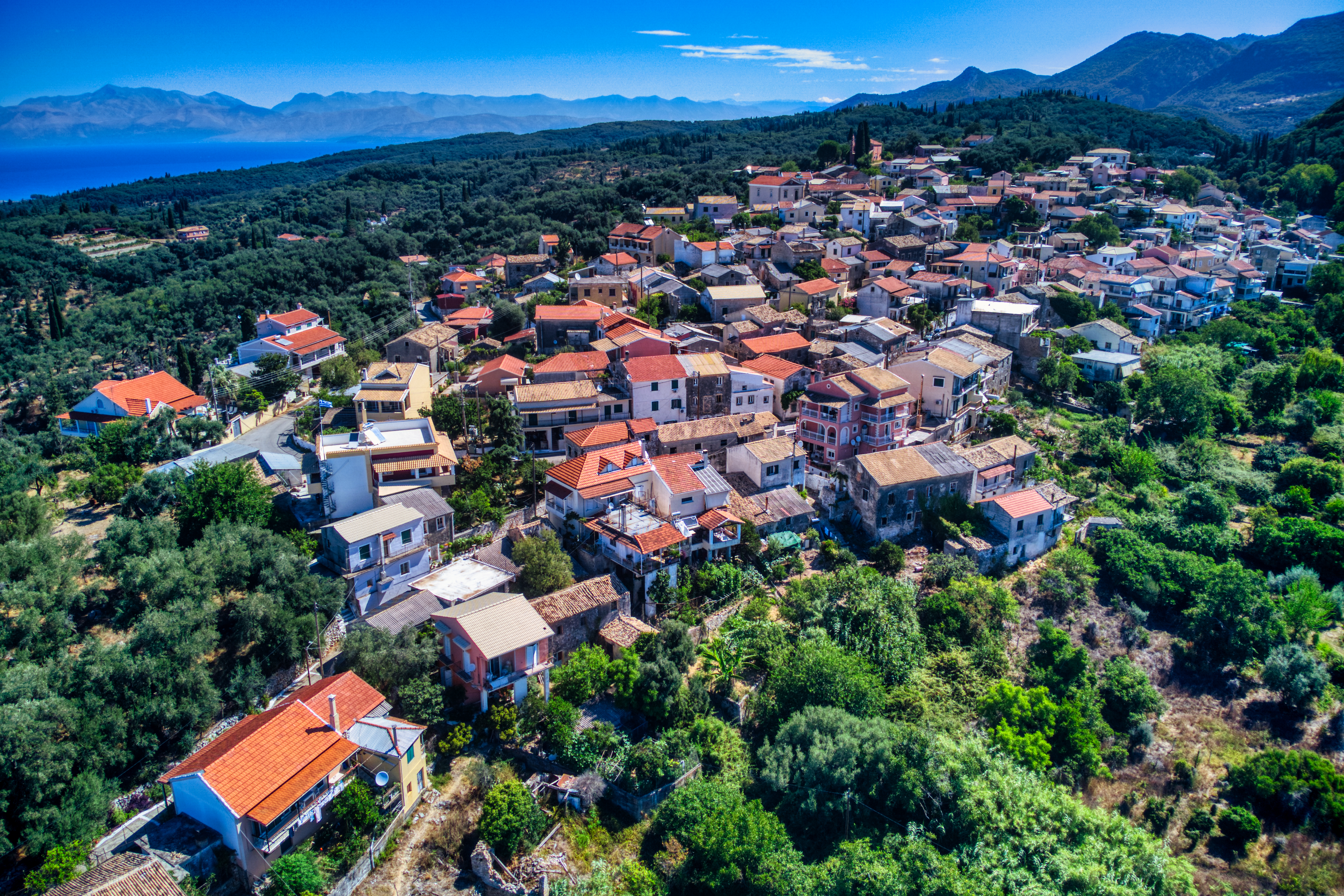

- Location within Greece
- Coordinates: 39°45′N 19°48′E
- Country: Greece
- Administrative region: Ionian Islands
- Regional unit: Corfu
- Municipality: North Corfu
- Municipal unit: Thinali

Population (2021)
  - Community: 1,033
- Time zone: UTC+2 (EET)
  - Summer (DST): UTC+3 (EEST)
- Vehicle registration: ΚΥ

Nymfes (Greek: Νύμφες [ˈɲiɱfes̠]; lit. 'nymphs') is a village and a community in the northern part of the island of Corfu, Greece. The community includes the village Platonas. Nymfes is situated in green hills, 4 km from the coast, and is home to Corfu's only waterfall. It is 3 km west of Episkepsi and 19 km northwest of Corfu (city).

== Population ==
Year	Settlement population	Community population
1981	1,029	-
1991	813	-
2001	756	1,124
2011	642	995
2021	612	1,033

== See also ==
- List of settlements in the Corfu regional unit
