= Thinali =

Thinali Θινάλι
- Municipal unit
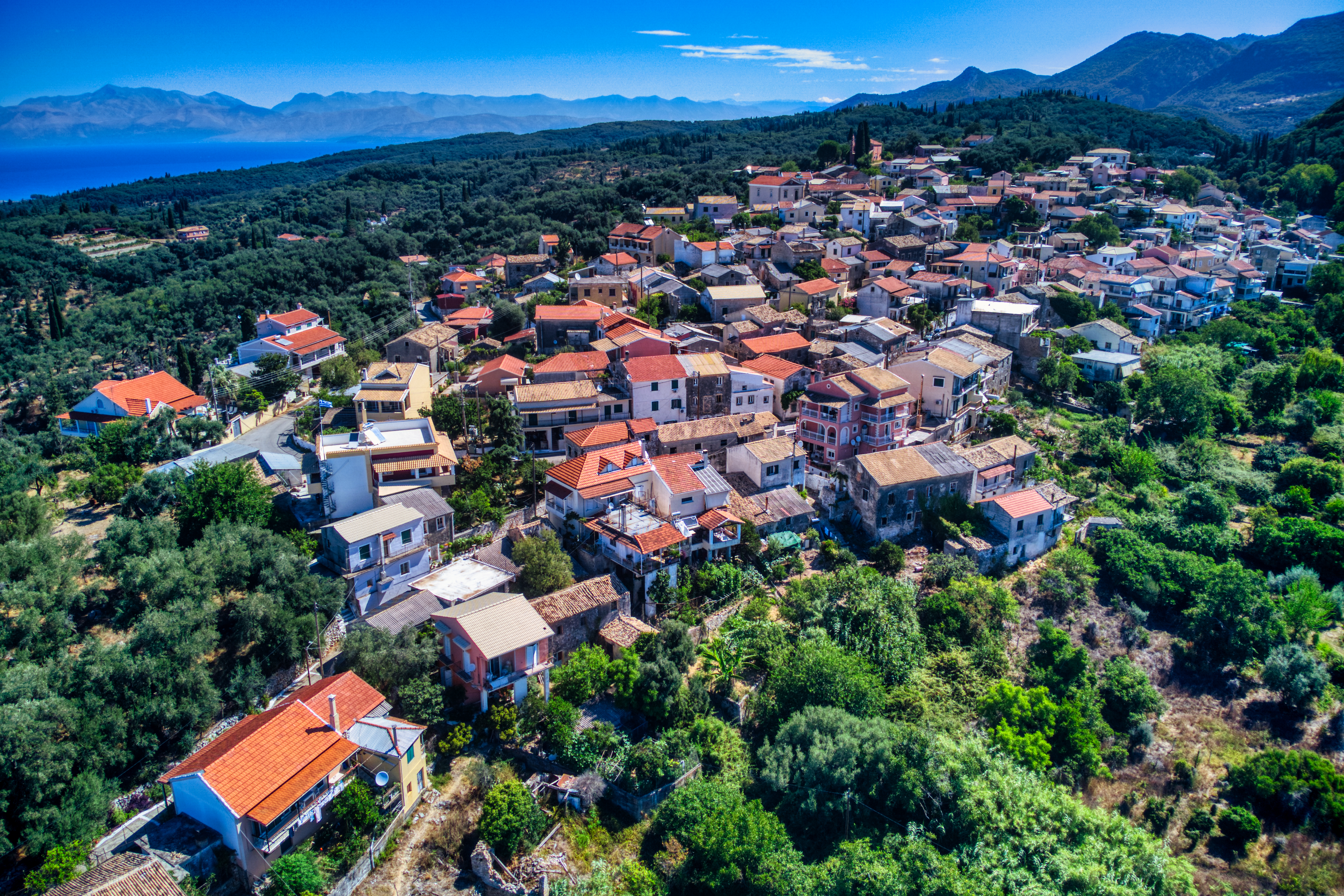
- Nymfes (Corfu)

- Location within the regional unit

- Location within Greece
- Coordinates: 39°46′N 19°49′E
- Country: Greece
- Administrative region: Ionian Islands
- Regional unit: Corfu
- Municipality: North Corfu

Area
  - Municipal unit: 77.9 km^{2} (30.1 sq mi)

Population (2021)
  - Municipal unit: 5,080
  - Municipal unit density: 65.2/km^{2} (169/sq mi)
- Time zone: UTC+2 (EET)
  - Summer (DST): UTC+3 (EEST)
- Vehicle registration: ΚΥ
- Website: www.thinali.gr

Thinali (Greek: Θινάλι) is a former municipality on the island of Corfu, Ionian Islands, Greece. Since the 2019 local government reform it is part of the municipality North Corfu, of which it is a municipal unit. It is located in the northernmost part of the island of Corfu, in the middle of the north coast. With its 77.899 km^{2}, it was the largest municipality on the island. The seat of the municipality was the town of Acharavi. It is located northwest of the city of Corfu. Last mayor of Thinali was Varelis Spiridon from village Lafki.

== Subdivisions ==
The municipal unit Thinali is subdivided into the following communities (constituent villages in brackets):

- Nymfes (Nymfes, Platonas)
- Agios Panteleimonas (Agios Panteleimonas, Acharavi, Vrachleri, Lazaratika, Priftiatika, Strongyli, Fourni)
- Episkepsi (Episkepsi, Agios Stefanos)
- Klimatia (Klimatia, Episkopi, Kyprianades)
- Lafki (Lafki, Agios Martinos, Psachnia, Trimodi)
- Loutses (Loutses, Anapaftiria, Apraos, Magarika)
- Xanthates
- Peritheia (Peritheia, Agios Ilias, Vathy, Vasilika, Vouni, Karniaris, Krinia, Pelekito, Perouli, Pithos, Riliatika)
- Petaleia (Petaleia, Droseri, Eriva, Perama, Strinyla)
- Sfakera (Sfakera, Roda)

== Population ==
Year	Population
1991	5,386
2001	5,512
2011	5,226
2021	5,080

== Geography ==
The municipal unit has a varied geography: the area near the sea is flat, and the southern part is mountainous. In the Pantokrator mountains, in the southeast, there are several picturesque mountain villages including Petaleia, Ano Peritheia and Lafki. The touristic beach centre of Roda is on the north coast. At the western edge of the municipality is the Antinioti Lagoon.

== Economy ==
Until recently, the economy of Thinali was mainly agricultural. A large part of the total production of olives and kumquats of Corfu is grown in Thinali. Other products includes wine, walnuts and citrus. Especially on the coast tourism has gained importance in recent years.
