= Agros, Greece =

Agros Αγρός
- Community
- Location within Greece
- Coordinates: 39°43′N 19°43′E
- Country: Greece
- Administrative region: Ionian Islands
- Regional unit: Corfu
- Municipality: North Corfu
- Municipal unit: Agios Georgios

Population (2021)
  - Community: 334
- Time zone: UTC+2 (EET)
  - Summer (DST): UTC+3 (EEST)
- Vehicle registration: ΚΥ

Agros (Greek: Αγρός) is a village and a community in the western part of the island of Corfu. It was the seat of the municipality of Agios Georgios. Agros is located west of the city of Corfu. The community consists of the villages Agros, Aspiotades, Manatades and Rafalades.

== Population ==
Year	Settlement population	Community population
1981	467	-
1991	298	-
2001	460	600
2011	271	365
2021	192	334

== See also ==
- List of settlements in the Corfu regional unit
