= Klimatia =

Klimatia (Greek: Κληματιά) may refer to several places in Greece:

- Klimatia, Corfu, a village in the island of Corfu
- Klimatia, Ioannina, a village in the Ioannina regional unit
