= Agios Stefanos Avliotes =

Agios Stefanos Beach Παραλία του Αγίου Στεφάνου
- Settlement
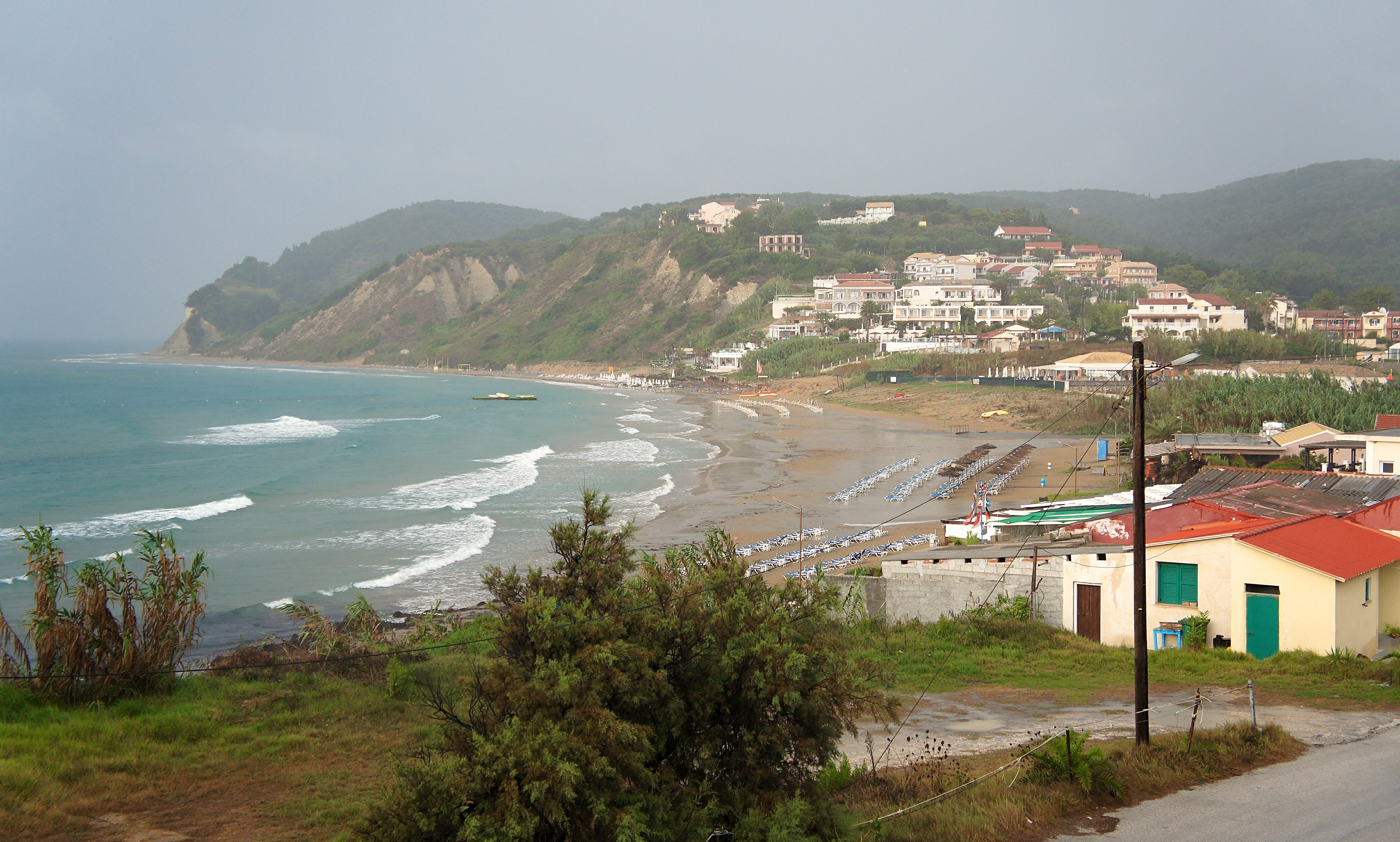
- Agios Stefanos NW Avlioton

- Location within Greece
- Coordinates: 39°45′N 19°38′E
- Country: Greece
- Administrative region: Ionian Islands
- Regional unit: Corfu
- Municipality: North Corfu
- Municipal unit: Esperies
- Community: Avliotes

Population (2021)
  - Total: 260
- Time zone: UTC+2 (EET)
  - Summer (DST): UTC+3 (EEST)
- Postal code: 49081
- Area code: 26630
- Vehicle registration: ΚΥ

Agios Stefanos (Greek: Άγιος Στέφανος, meaning Saint Stephen) was originally a fishing village for the nearby village of Avliotes located on the north west coast of Corfu island. In 2021, its population was 260. It is located 35 km from Corfu town, approximate transfer time by car is 1h 15 min. It has a safe harbor on the north west side of Corfu Island, where the four Diapontia Islands (Othonoi, Erikoussa, Mathraki and Diaplo) can be seen, while further away the Adriatic Sea is the natural frontier between Greece and Italy. Fishing is still a very important part of the local economy. Agios Stefanos (Beach) attracts a number of tourists each summer. The village still has its old church where it gets its name and some pretty old traditional buildings; it offers a few hotels and apartments, there are also a variety of tavernas/restaurants and an assortment of bars. Agios Stefanos (Beach) can be reached by the regular local bus service, via taxi or by private vehicle.

Not to be confused with Agios Stefanos (NE) (Gr. Άγιος Στέφανος Σινιών, also meaning Saint Stephen) which is also a small fishing village at the exact opposite side on the north east coast of Corfu island.

== See also ==
- List of settlements in the Corfu regional unit
