= Sidari =

Sidari Σιδάρι
- Settlement
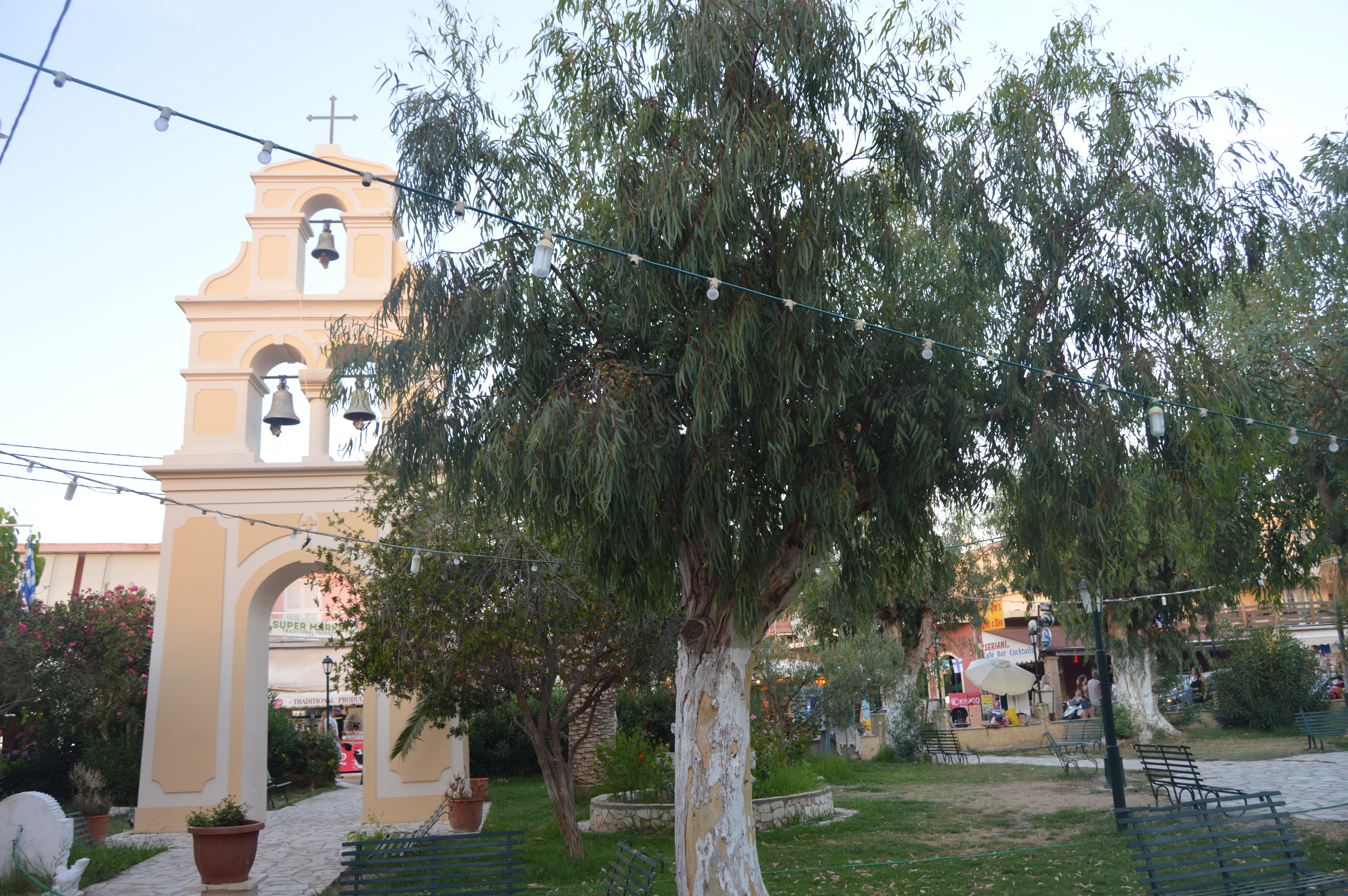
- Sidari Monastery

- Location within Greece
- Coordinates: 39°47′N 19°42′E
- Country: Greece
- Administrative region: Ionian Islands
- Regional unit: Corfu
- Municipality: North Corfu
- Municipal unit: Esperies

Population (2021)
  - Total: 506
- Time zone: UTC+2 (EET)
  - Summer (DST): UTC+3 (EEST)

Sidari (Greek: Σιδάρι) is a resort village in the northern part of the island of Corfu, Greece. It is a community of the municipal unit of Esperies. It is the site of an ancient monastery.

== Population ==
Year	Settlement population
1981	218
1991	269
2001	371
2011	386
2021	506

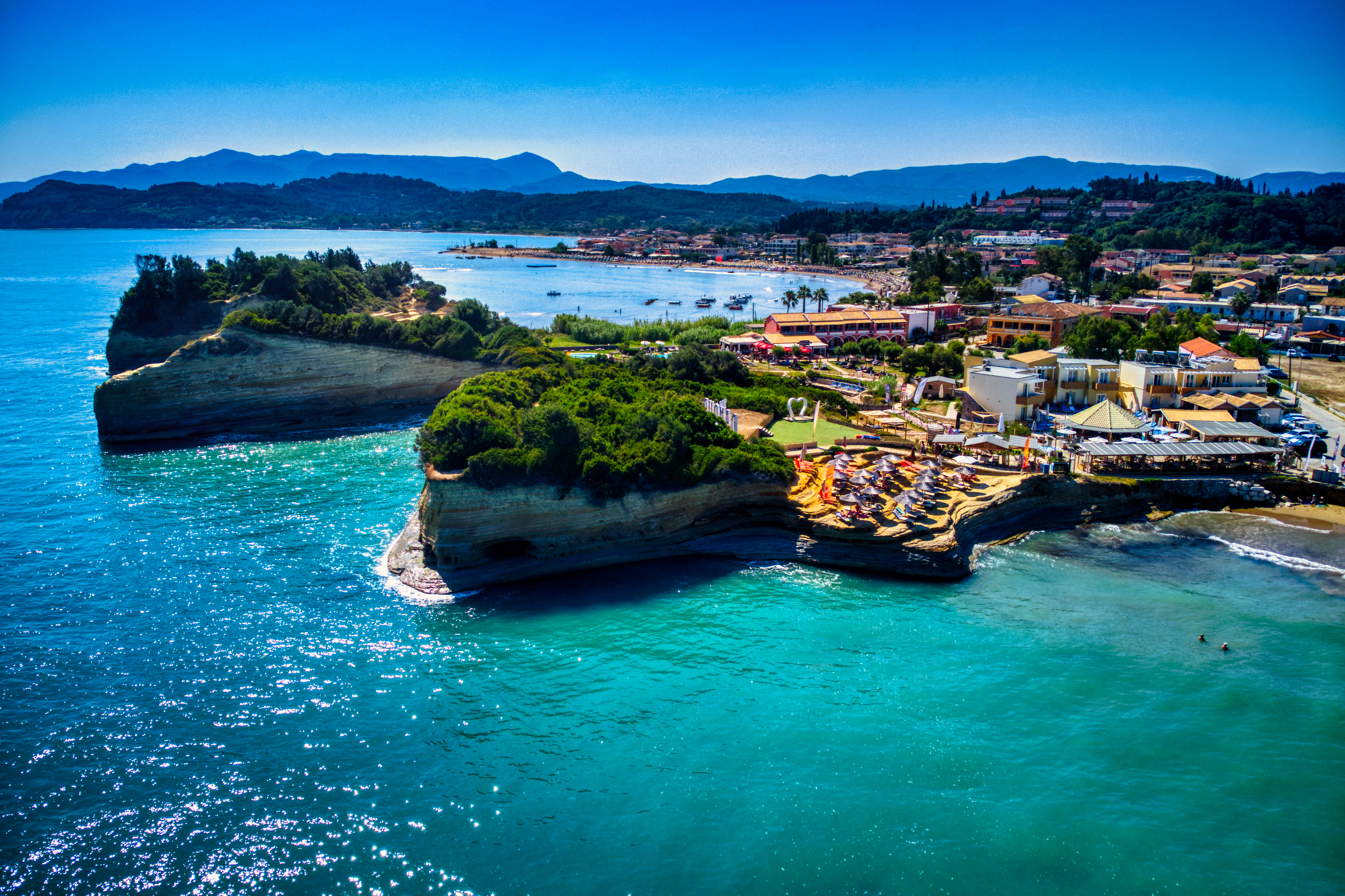
Kanali tou Erota

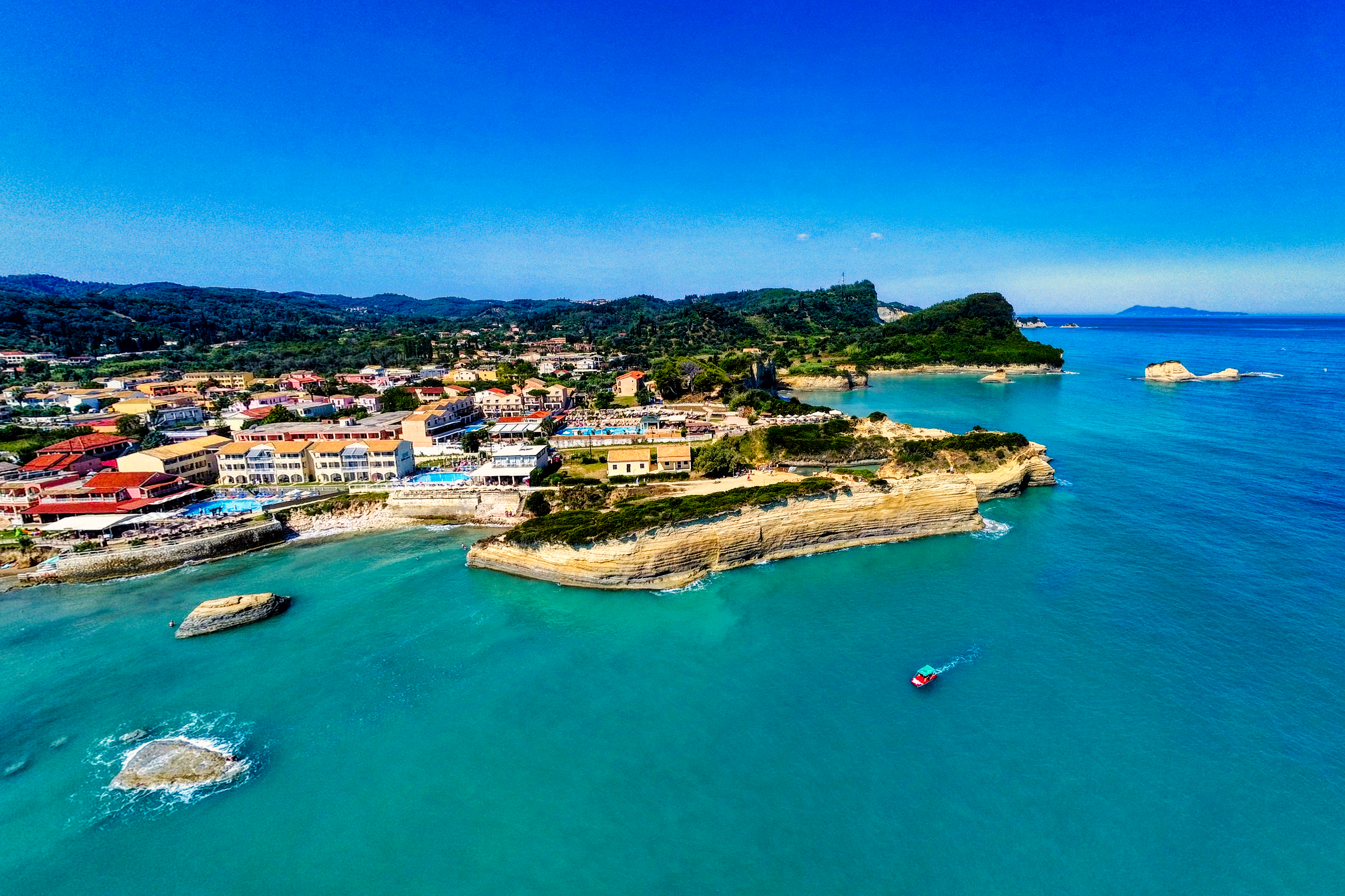
Kanali tou Erota

== See also ==
- List of settlements in the Corfu regional unit
