= Pagoi =

Village on the island of Corfu, Greece

Pagoi Πάγοι
- Community
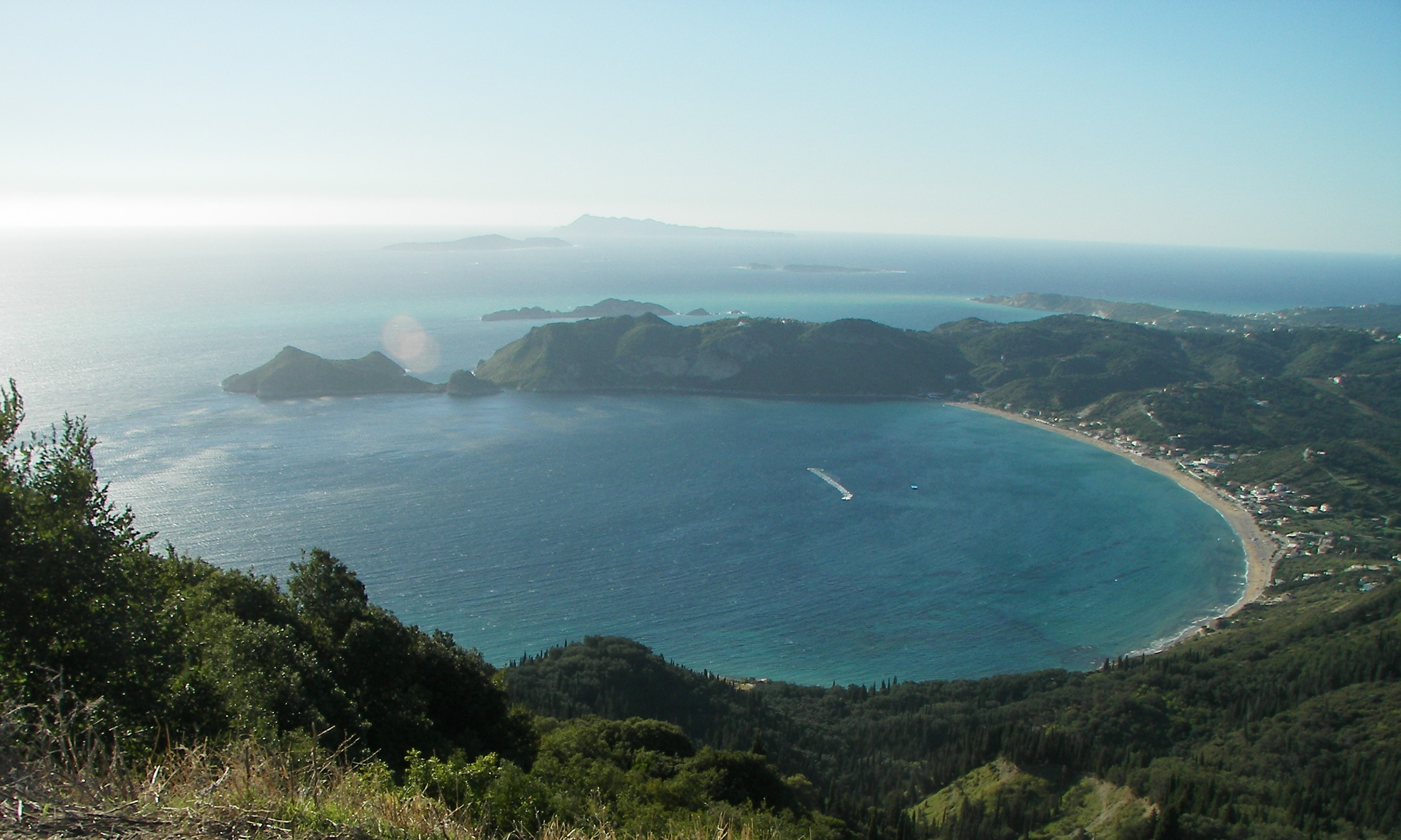
- Agios Georgios Bay

- Location within Greece
- Coordinates: 39°42′N 19°42′E
- Country: Greece
- Administrative region: Ionian Islands
- Regional unit: Corfu
- Municipality: North Corfu
- Municipal unit: Agios Georgios

Population (2021)
  - Community: 394
- Time zone: UTC+2 (EET)
  - Summer (DST): UTC+3 (EEST)
- Vehicle registration: ΚΥ

Pagoi (Greek: Πάγοι) is a village in the northwestern part of Corfu Island in Greece, and a community of the municipal unit Agios Georgios. The community consists of the villages Pagoi, Agios Georgios, Prinylas, Roumpatatika and Vatonies. The community had a population of 394 as of the 2021 census.

== Villages ==
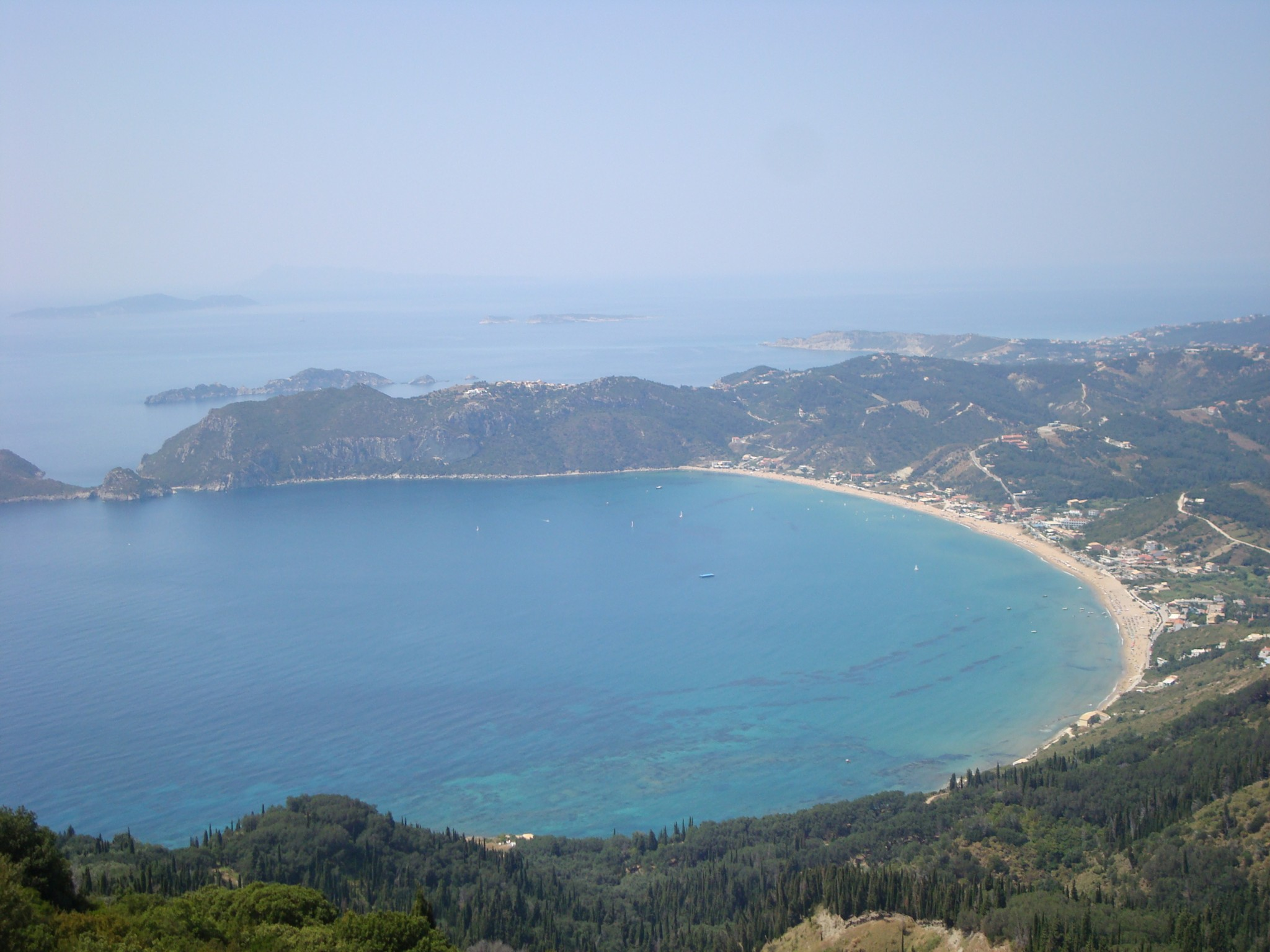
Agios Georgios Pagon beach

=== Pagoi ===
The village Pagoi had 131 inhabitants at the 2021 census.

=== Agios Georgios Pagon ===
The village Agios Georgios Pagon had 62 inhabitants at the 2021 census. It was developed as a tourist resort in the third quarter of the 20th century. It has a few old buildings, including the Saint George church and the Tsimpougis house. Ruins of an older settlement that was destroyed by a landslide are situated on the beach.

=== Prinylas ===
The village Prinylas had 59 inhabitants at the 2021 census. The village is built in a panoramic setting above Agios Georgios Bay. It was the seat of the Byzantine Decarch, as mentioned in 1200. A common last name in the village is Gialopsos. The name likely comes from the ancient Greek <<αἰγιαλόν όψοντες>> which translates roughly to "watchers of the shore" or "beach watchers". It is a settlement with characteristic streets, houses, and archives from the 17th century. Prinyla is a well-preserved village and has a church, Agios Nikolaos, that was constructed in the 14th century.

=== Vatonies ===
The village Vatonies had 51 inhabitants at the 2021 census. Vatonies has a church, Agion Apostolon, and a tavern.

=== Use in James Bond film ===
The area was used as a filming location in the 1981 James Bond film For Your Eyes Only, where Bond (played by Roger Moore) and Melina Havelock (Carole Bouquet) fled from villains in their yellow Citroen 2CV.

== Last names ==
Common last names of the area are:

- Payatakis (probably from Crete 17th century)
- Romeo (probably from ancient Italy or Crete 17th century)
- Ruva (probably from ancient Italy or Crete 17th century)
- Sinadinos (probably from Sinada in minor Asia 13th century)
- Gialopsos (probably from Byzantine Corfu around 12th or 13th century)
