= Sfakera =

Sfakera Σφακερά
- Community
- Location within Greece
- Coordinates: 39°46′N 19°47′E
- Country: Greece
- Administrative region: Ionian Islands
- Regional unit: Corfu
- Municipality: North Corfu
- Municipal unit: Thinali

Population (2021)
  - Community: 702
- Time zone: UTC+2 (EET)
  - Summer (DST): UTC+3 (EEST)

Sfakera (Greek: Σφακερά) is a village on the north coast of the island of Corfu, Greece. It is part of the municipal unit of Thinali.
