= Velonades =

Velonades Βελονάδες
- Community
- Location within Greece
- Coordinates: 39°46′N 19°42′E
- Country: Greece
- Administrative region: Ionian Islands
- Regional unit: Corfu
- Municipality: North Corfu
- Municipal unit: Esperies

Population (2021)
  - Community: 908
- Time zone: UTC+2 (EET)
  - Summer (DST): UTC+3 (EEST)

Velonades (Greek: Βελονάδες) is a village and a community of the municipal unit of Esperies, in the northern part of the island of Corfu, Greece. The community includes the villages Kounavades, Livadi and Psathylas. Velonades is located northwest of the city of Corfu.

== Population ==
Year	Village population	Community population
1981	-	802
1991	338	-
2001	473	958
2011	392	863
2021	398	908

== See also ==
- List of settlements in the Corfu regional unit
