= Peroulades =

Peroulades Περουλάδες
- Community
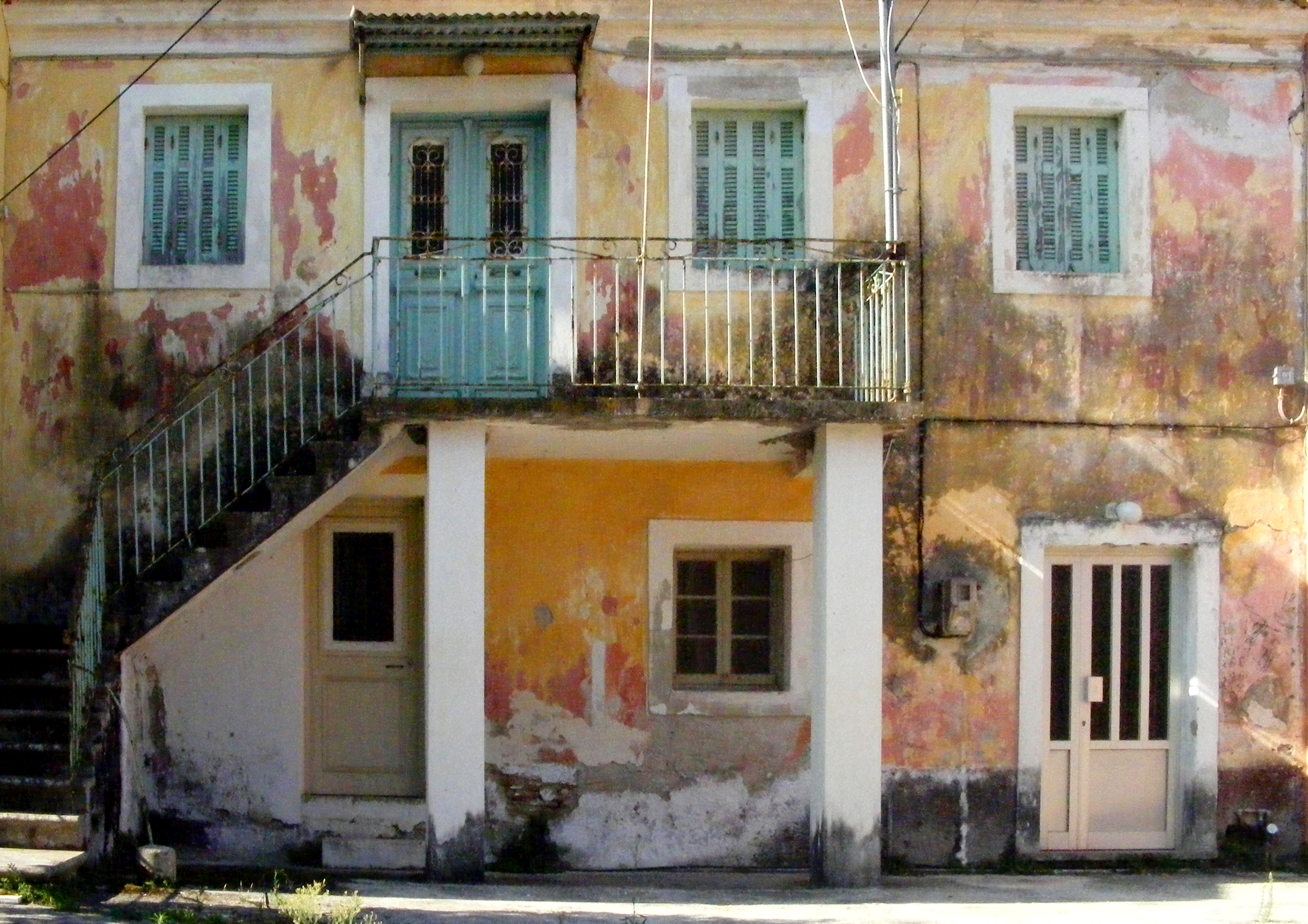

- Location within Greece
- Coordinates: 39°47′N 19°40′E
- Country: Greece
- Administrative region: Ionian Islands
- Regional unit: Corfu
- Municipality: North Corfu
- Municipal unit: Esperies

Population (2021)
  - Community: 685
- Time zone: UTC+2 (EET)
  - Summer (DST): UTC+3 (EEST)

Peroulades (Greek: Περουλάδες) is a village in the north-western part of the island of Corfu, Greece. Its population stood at 685 in 2021 and its economy is based mainly on tourism and secondarily on olive tree cultivation. The village boasts a number of picturesque coves, including Kanal Nt Amour, Apotripiti and Logas (Sunset Beach), alongside dramatic coastal cliffs. It administratively belongs to the Esperies municipal unit.
