= Klimatia, Corfu =

Klimatia Κληματιά
- Community
- Location within Greece
- Coordinates: 39°44′N 19°47′E
- Country: Greece
- Administrative region: Ionian Islands
- Regional unit: Corfu
- Municipality: North Corfu
- Municipal unit: Thinali

Population (2021)
  - Community: 301
- Time zone: UTC+2 (EET)
  - Summer (DST): UTC+3 (EEST)
- Vehicle registration: ΚΥ

Klimatia (Greek: Κληματιά [klimaˈtʝa]) is a village and a community in the northern part of the island of Corfu, Greece. The community includes the villages Episkopi and Kyprianades. Klimatia is situated in green hills. It is 2 km south of Nymfes and 17 km northwest of Corfu.

== Population ==
Year	Settlement population	Community population
1981	-	463
1991	365	-
2001	364	510
2011	229	289
2021	234	301

== See also ==
- List of settlements in the Corfu regional unit
