= Lake Antiniotissa =

Lake in Corfu, Greece

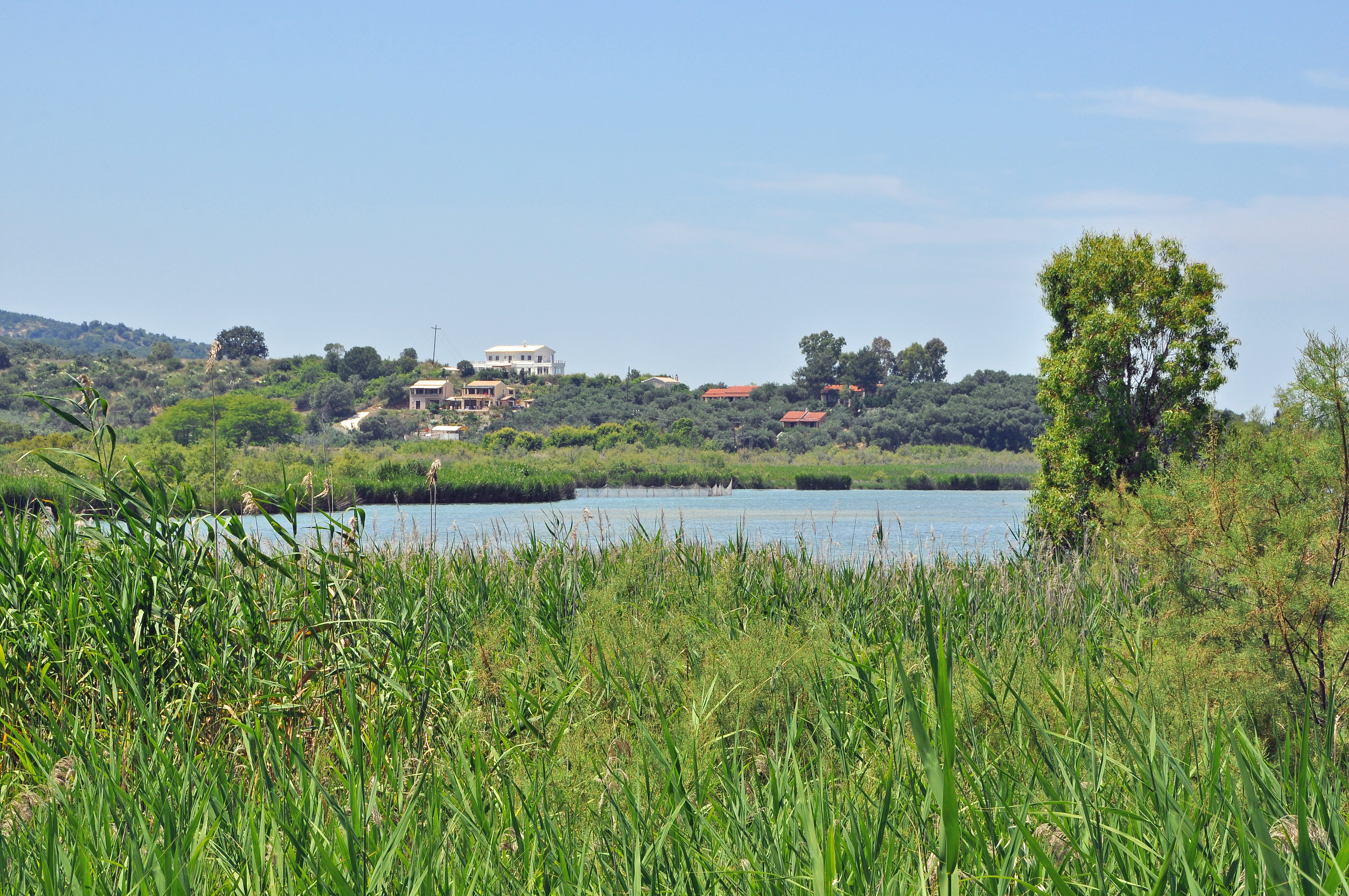

- Location within Corfu
- Location: Corfu, Greece
- Coordinates: 39.813148°N 19.850539°E

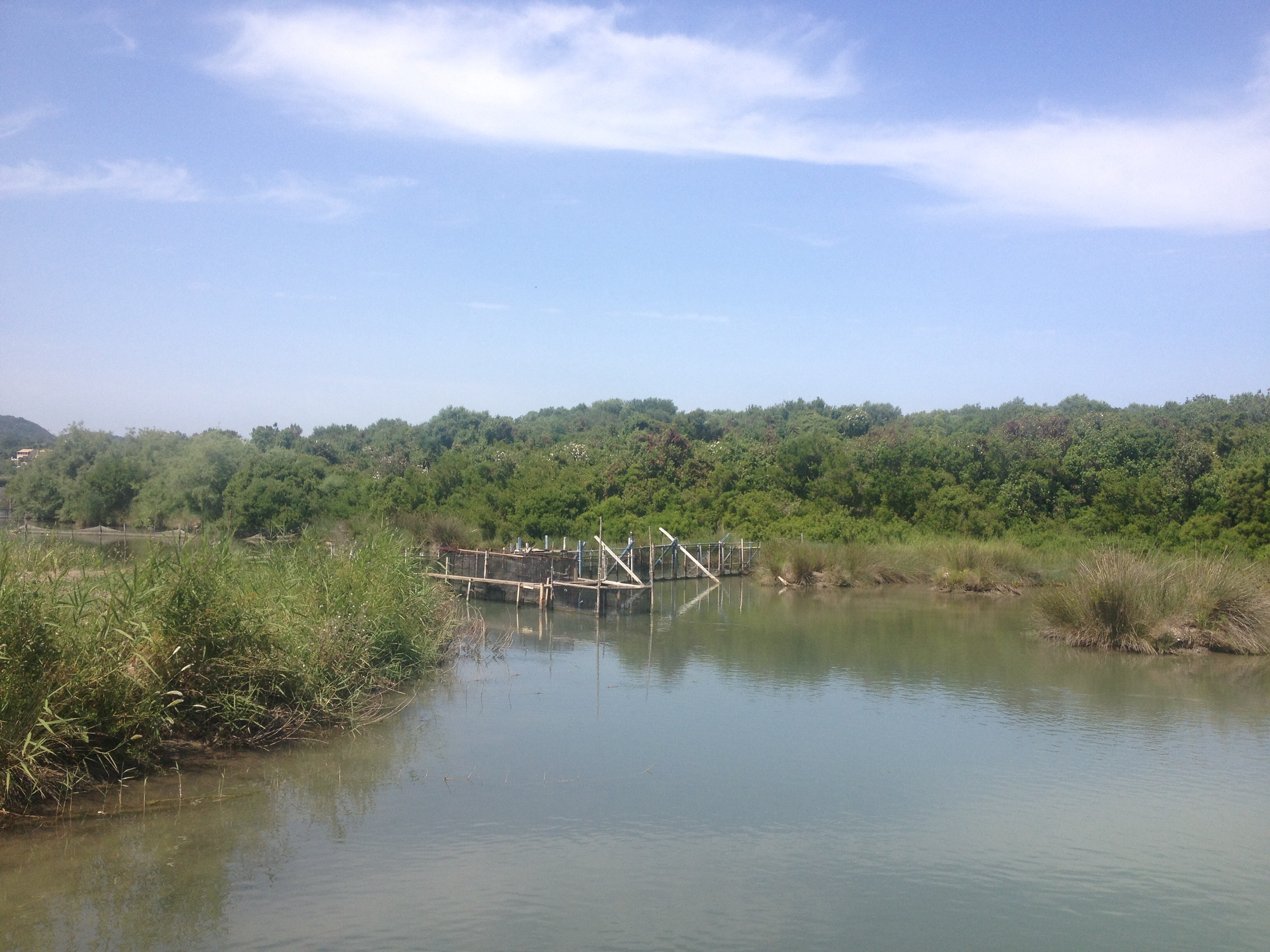
The outlet of Lake Antinioti into the Ionian Sea.

Lake Antiniotissa or Antinioti (Greek: Λίμνη Αντινιώτισσα/Αντινιώτη), sometimes known as Antinioti Lagoon, is a small brackish lake on the north-east coast of Corfu, Greece near Agios Spyridon beach. It is an important wetland area and lies within a Natura 2000 nature protection area of 188 hectares (460 acres) at the western edge of the municipal unit of Thinali. The lake's Greek name translates into English as "the enemy of youth". It was once a malarial swamp and home to the anopheles mosquito, resulting in the area being uninhabited for many centuries, and it is still comparatively undeveloped. The vegetation surrounding the lake includes thickets of reed and bamboo. Inland there are orchards, olive groves and farmland, while between the lake and the sea lie sand dunes. The lake is jointly owned by the twelve principal villages of north-eastern Corfu and leased for fish farming, producing flathead grey mullet, sea bass and eel. It is also used for duck hunting. The adjacent dunes are home to the sand lily (pancratium maritimum) and the agile frog (rana dalmatina). The lake as it was in the 1930s was described by the British naturalist Gerald Durrell in his childhood autobiography My Family and Other Animals, in which it was called the "Lake of Lillies". Durrell wrote that:

it was a mile long, an elongated sheet of shallow water surrounded by a thick mane of cane and reed, and separated from the sea at one end by a wide, gently curving dune of white sand… It was the only place on the island where those sand lilies grew, strange misshapen bulbs buried in the sand, that once a year sent up thick green leaves and white flowers above the surface, so that the dune became a glacier of flowers.

— Gerald Durrell, My Family and Other Animals
