= Esperies =

Esperies Εσπερίες
- Municipal unit
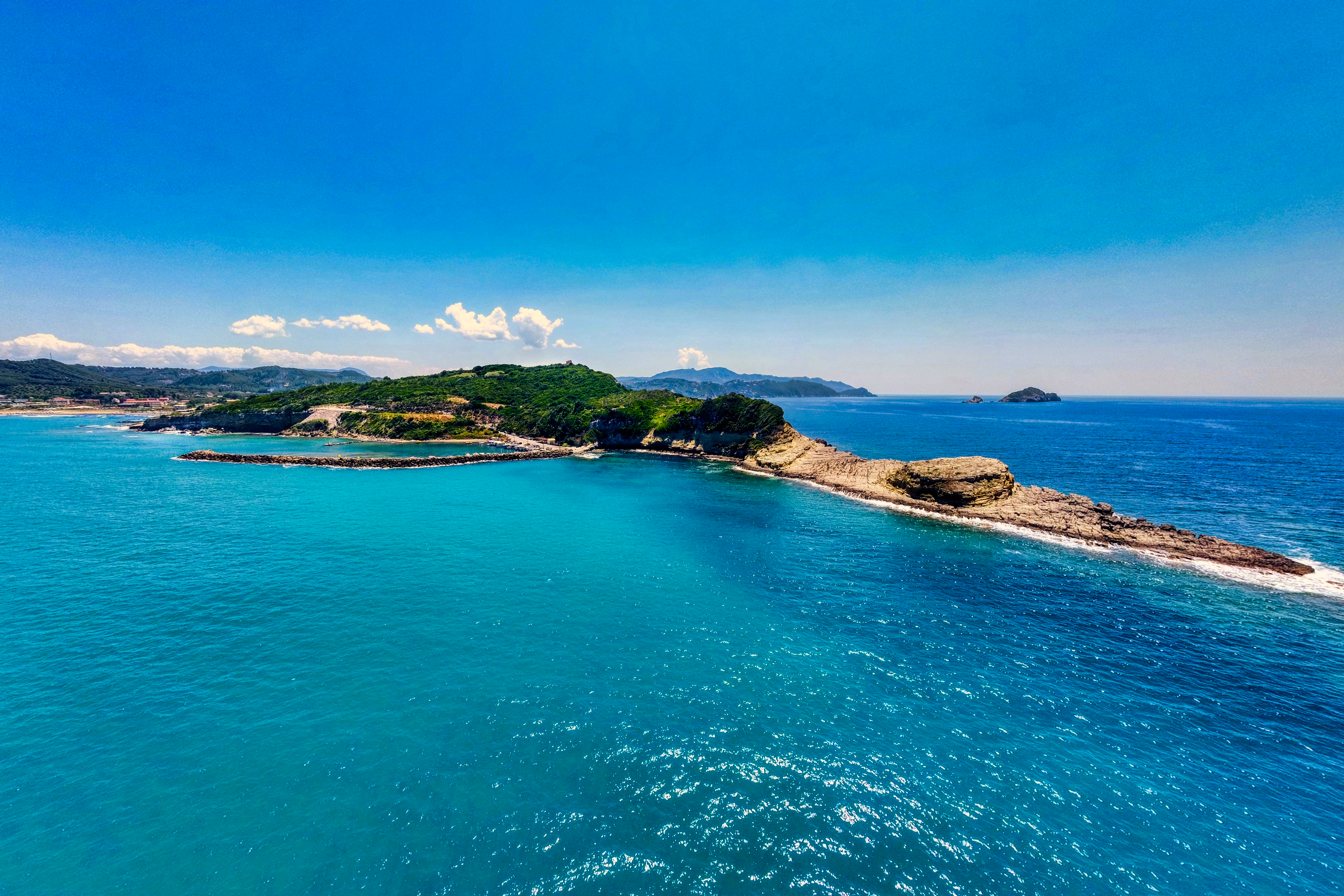
- Cape Kefali, Agios Stefanos Avliotes

- Location within the regional unit

- Location within Greece
- Coordinates: 39°47′N 19°43′E
- Country: Greece
- Administrative region: Ionian Islands
- Regional unit: Corfu
- Municipality: North Corfu

Area
  - Municipal unit: 54.5 km^{2} (21.0 sq mi)

Population (2021)
  - Municipal unit: 6,925
  - Municipal unit density: 127/km^{2} (329/sq mi)
- Time zone: UTC+2 (EET)
  - Summer (DST): UTC+3 (EEST)
- Vehicle registration: ΚΥ

Esperies (Greek: Εσπερίες) is a former municipality on the island of Corfu, Ionian Islands, Greece. Since the 2019 local government reform it is part of the municipality North Corfu, of which it is a municipal unit. It is located in the northwest corner of the island of Corfu. It has a land area of 54.462 square kilometres (21.03 sq mi) and a population of 6,925 (2021 census). The seat of the municipality was the town of Velonades.

== Subdivisions ==
The municipal unit Esperies is subdivided into the following communities (constituent villages in brackets):

- Agioi Douloi
- Agrafoi (Agrafoi, Agia Paraskevi)
- Antipernoi
- Avliotes (Avliotes, Agia Pelagia, Agios Stefanos Avliotes, Garnades, Kouknikades, Staousa)
- Kavallouri
- Karousades (Karousades, Agios Ioannis, Astrakeri, Roda)
- Magoulades (Magoulades, Arillas, Gousades, Poulimates, Tsoukalio)
- Peroulades (Peroulades, Mega Ydri)
- Sidari
- Valaneio
- Velonades (Velonades, Kounavades, Livadi, Psathylas)

== Population ==
| Year | Population |
|---|---|
| 1991 | 7,264 |
| 2001 | 8,136 |
| 2011 | 6,990 |
| 2021 | 6,925 |
