= Afionas =

Afionas Αφιώνας
- Community
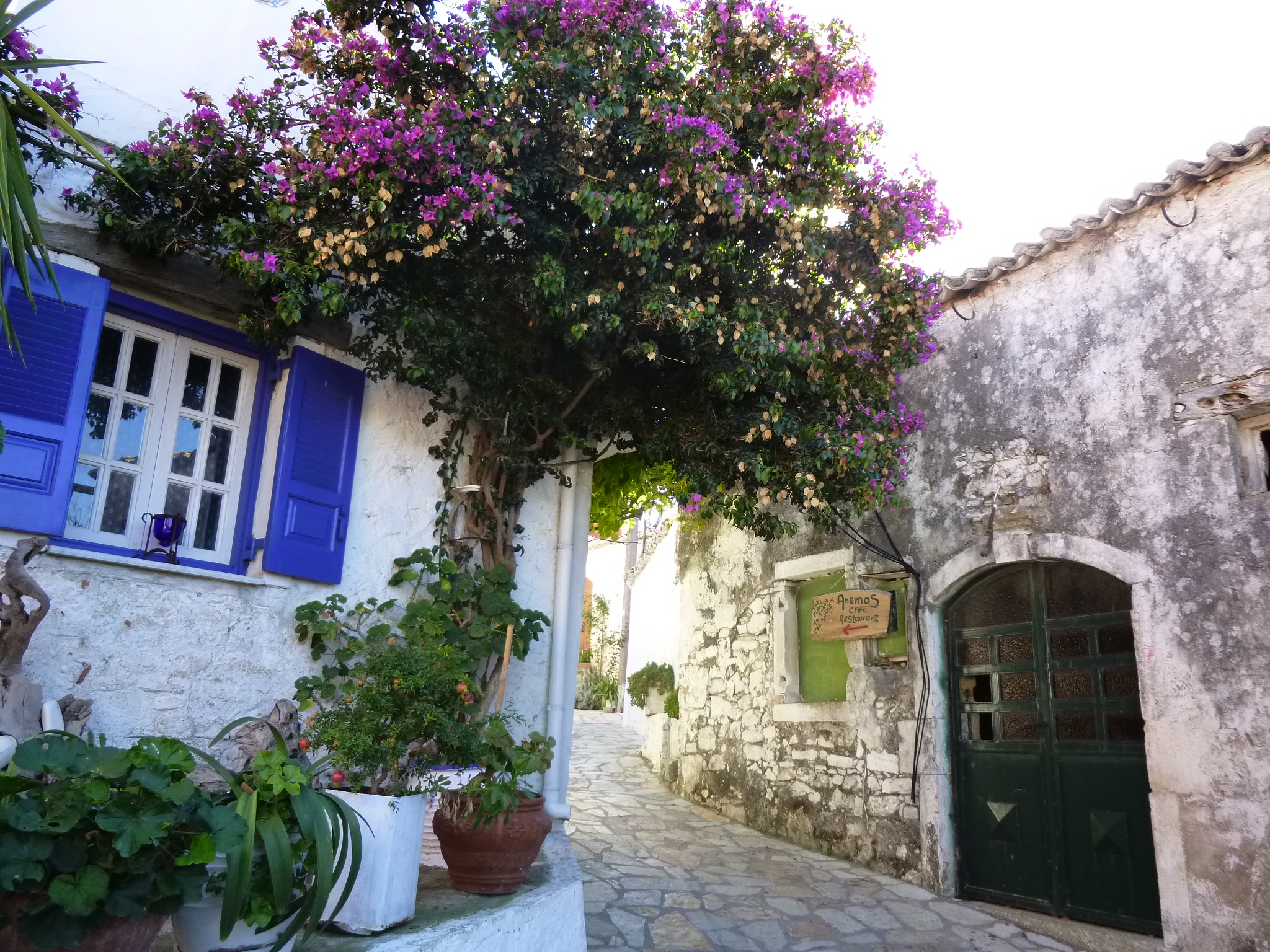
- Afionas

- Location within Greece
- Country: Greece
- Administrative region: Ionian Islands
- Regional unit: Corfu
- Municipality: Central Corfu and Diapontian Islands
- Municipal unit: Agios Georgios

Population (2021)
  - Community: 275
- Time zone: UTC+2 (EET)
  - Summer (DST): UTC+3 (EEST)

Afionas (Greek: Αφιώνας) is a Greek village on the island of Corfu.

== Overview ==
Afionas is located in northwestern Corfu on a lofty promontory 37 km from Corfu Town. The village has panoramic views of the Ionian Sea and the Diapontia Islands to the northwest and the bay of Agios Georgios to the southeast.

It is a well-known tourist destination with old mansions, colorful houses and cobblestone streets. The parish church of the village is Agios Ioannis Lampataris, built in 1636.

Southwest, about a 20-minute walk away, is the "double beach" of Porto Timoni.

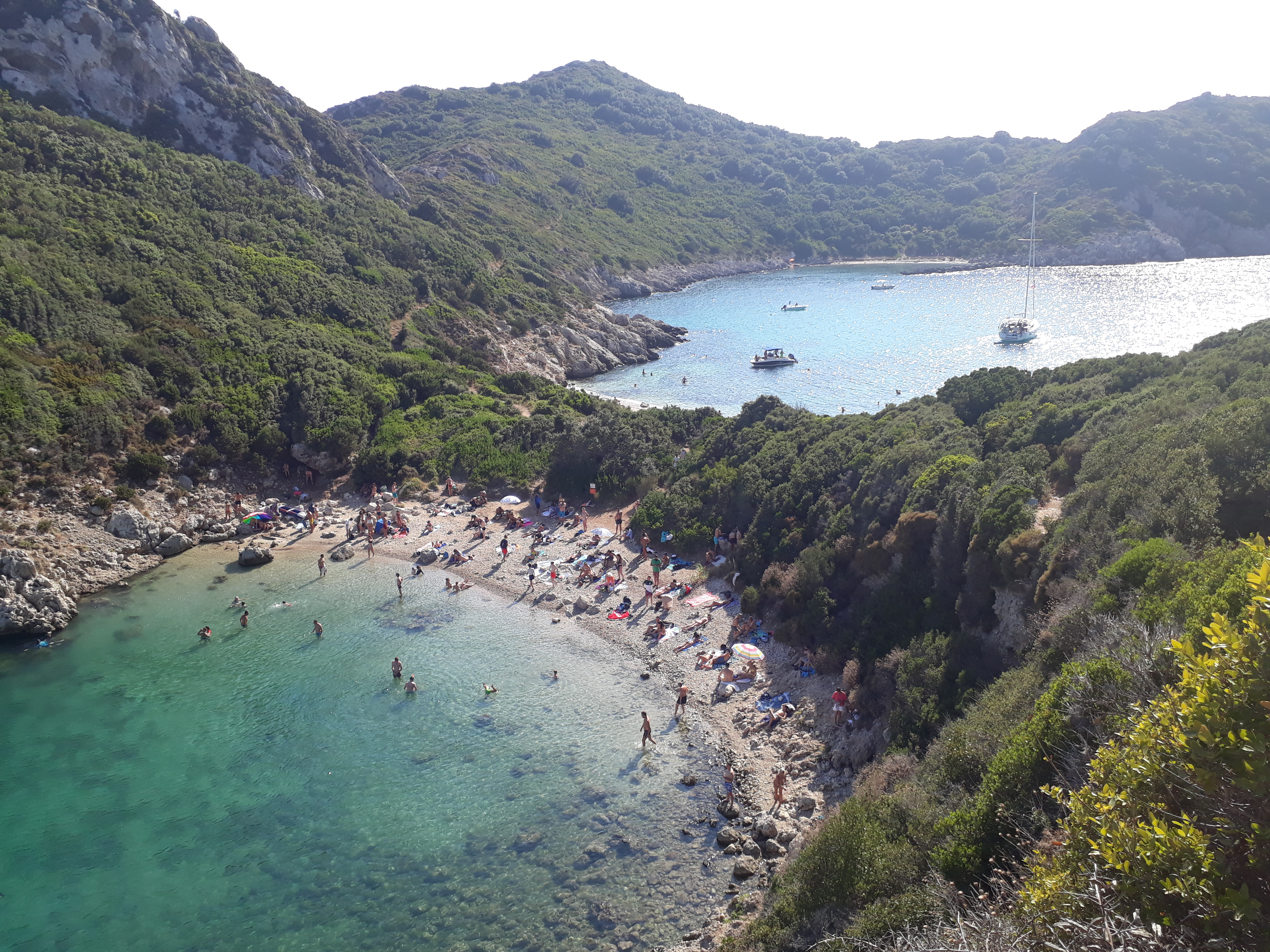
Porto Timoni beach, Afionas, Corfu

Between the village and Porto Timoni, there are ruins of medieval fortifications that protected the village from pirate raids. A Neolithic settlement from the 2nd millennium BC has been discovered in the area, with findings exhibited at the Archaeological Museum of Corfu.

The village has a memorial to Ektoras Gialopsos, an Ensign in the Greek Navy who died during the Imia Crisis. Gialopsos was born in Afionas.
