= Acharavi =

Acharavi Αχαράβη
- Settlement
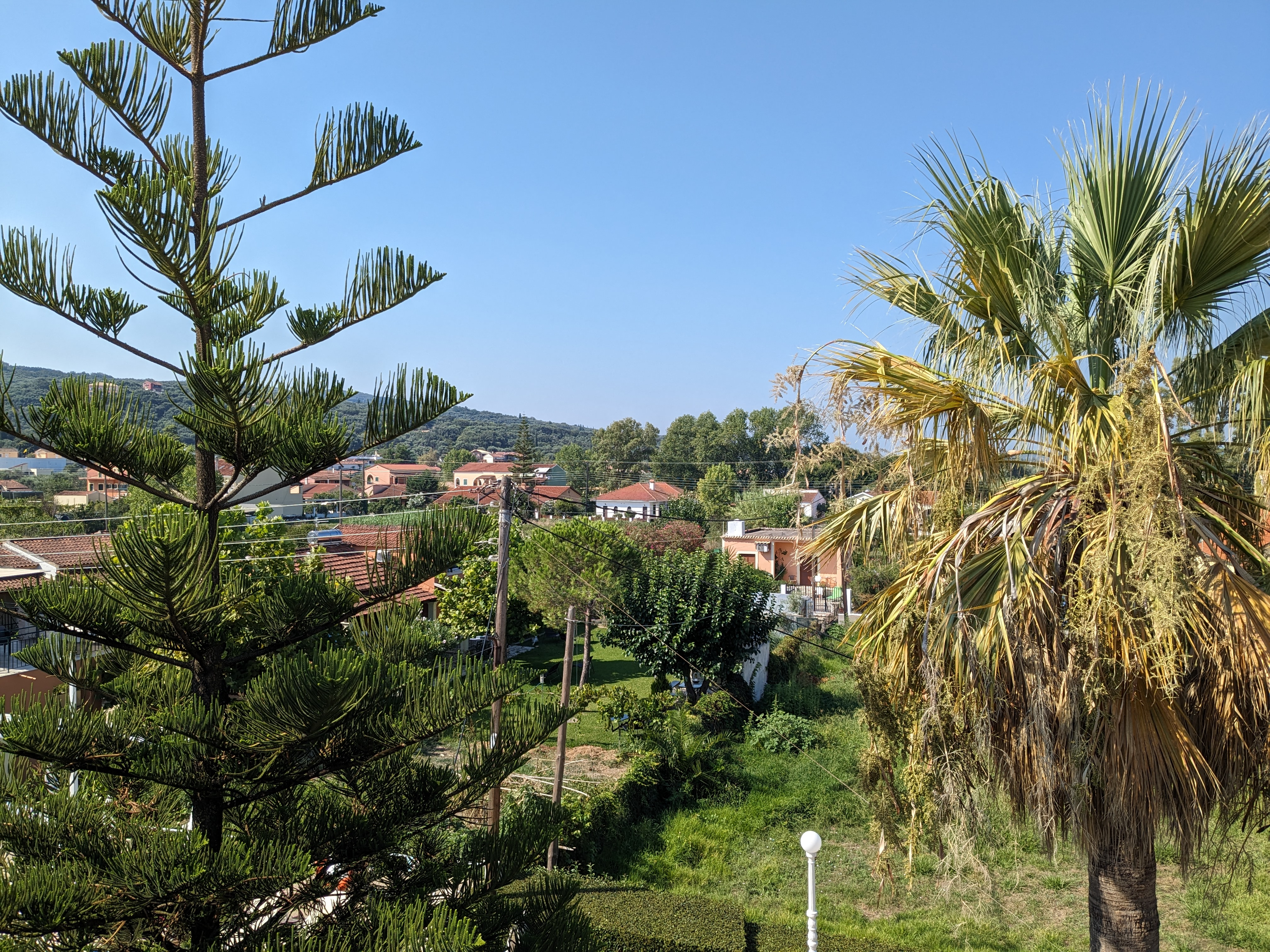
- Acharavi Village

- Location within Greece
- Coordinates: 39°47′N 19°49′E
- Country: Greece
- Administrative region: Ionian Islands
- Regional unit: Corfu
- Municipality: North Corfu
- Municipal unit: Thinali
- Community: Agios Panteleimonas

Population (2021)
  - Total: 1,100
- Time zone: UTC+2 (EET)
  - Summer (DST): UTC+3 (EEST)
- Vehicle registration: ΚΥ

Acharavi (Greek: Αχαράβη) is a settlement in the northern coast of Corfu, Greece. The area offers a view of the Albanian coast. It is the seat of the municipality North Corfu.

== Population ==
Year	Population
1981	545
1991	472
2001	657
2011	1,013
2021	1,100

== History ==
Acharavi belongs to the community of Agios Panteleimonas (pronounounced: 'Agios Padel'eimonas, Greek: Άγιος Παντελέημονας). The formerly independent community of Agios Panteleimonas is nowadays one of the ten official sections of the municipal unit of Thinali. Etymologically, the name Acharavi consists of the Greek words Achari Hebe (pronounounced: 'Ahari Ivi, Greek: Άχαρη Ήβη) meaning "ungracious life/youth". Originally it was called Hebe and was an ancient Greek city, possibly named after the daughter of Zeus, Hebe. The city was destroyed in 32 BC by the Roman Emperor Octavian and was thus renamed from the city of life "Hebe" into the city of "Ungracious Life" Acharavi. After World War II and the Greek Civil War, its village was mainly rebuilt.

== See also ==
- List of settlements in the Corfu regional unit
