= Episkepsi =

Episkepsi Επίσκεψη
- Community
- Location within Greece
- Coordinates: 39°45′N 19°49′E
- Country: Greece
- Administrative region: Ionian Islands
- Regional unit: Corfu
- Municipality: North Corfu
- Municipal unit: Thinali

Population (2021)
  - Community: 527
- Time zone: UTC+2 (EET)
  - Summer (DST): UTC+3 (EEST)
- Vehicle registration: ΚΥ

Episkepsi (Greek: Επίσκεψη) is a village and a community in the northern part of the island of Corfu, Greece. It is part of the municipal unit of Thinali. The community includes the village Agios Stefanos.

== Population ==
Year	Settlement population	Community population
1991	603	-
2001	486	579
2011	332	537
2021	283	527

== See also ==
- List of settlements in the Corfu regional unit
