= Agios Georgios, Corfu =

Agios Georgios Άγιος Γεώργιος
- Municipal unit
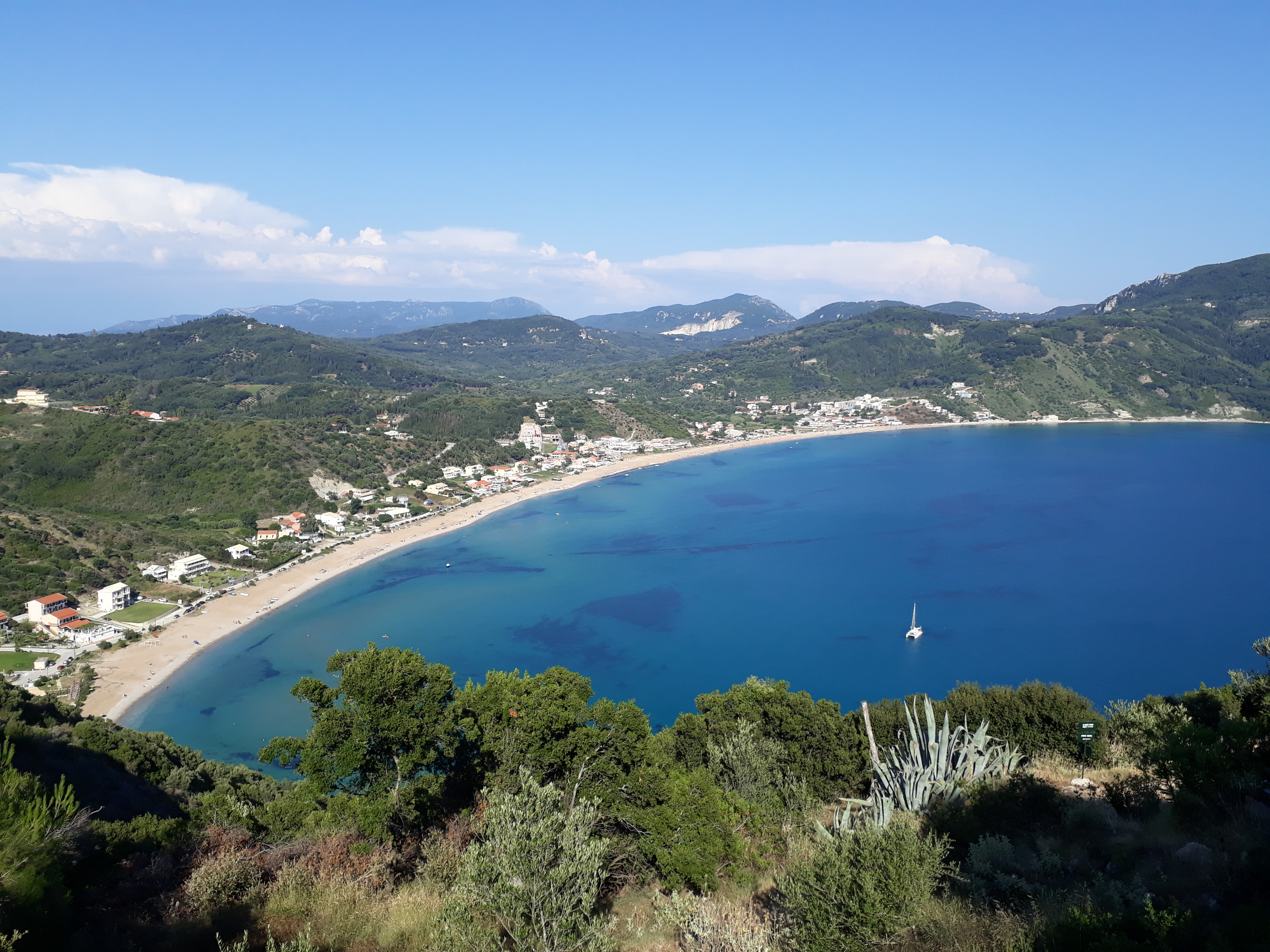
- Agios Georgios

- Location within the regional unit

- Location within Greece
- Coordinates: 39°45′N 19°41′E
- Country: Greece
- Administrative region: Ionian Islands
- Regional unit: Corfu
- Municipality: North Corfu

Area
  - Municipal unit: 39.4 km^{2} (15.2 sq mi)

Population (2021)
  - Municipal unit: 2,992
  - Municipal unit density: 75.9/km^{2} (197/sq mi)
- Time zone: UTC+2 (EET)
  - Summer (DST): UTC+3 (EEST)
- Vehicle registration: ΚΥ

Agios Georgios (Greek: Άγιος Γεώργιος meaning Saint George) is a village and a former municipality on the island of Corfu, Ionian Islands, Greece. Since the 2019 local government reform it is part of the municipality North Corfu, of which it is a municipal unit. It is located in the northwestern part of Corfu and has a land area of 39.445 square kilometres (15.230 square miles) and a population of 2,992 (2021 census). The seat of the municipality was the town of Agros.

== Subdivisions ==
The municipal unit Agios Georgios is subdivided into the following communities (constituent villages in brackets):

- Agros (Agros, Aspiotades, Manatades, Rafalades)
- Agios Athanasios
- Arkadades
- Armenades (Armenades, Agios Georgios, Termenades)
- Afionas (Afionas, Afionitika)
- Dafni (Dafni, Gavrades)
- Drosato
- Kavvadades (Kavvadades, Arillas, Saoulatika)
- Kastelannoi Gyrou (Kastelannoi, Troumpettas)
- Mesaria (Mesaria, Kopsocheilades)
- Pagoi (Pagoi, Agios Georgios Pagon, Prinylas, Vatonies)
- Rachtades
- Chorepiskopoi

== Population ==
Year	Population
1991	4,492
2001	4,958
2011	3,431
2021	2,992

== See also ==
- List of settlements in the Corfu regional unit
