= Avliotes =

Avliotes Αυλιώτες
- Community
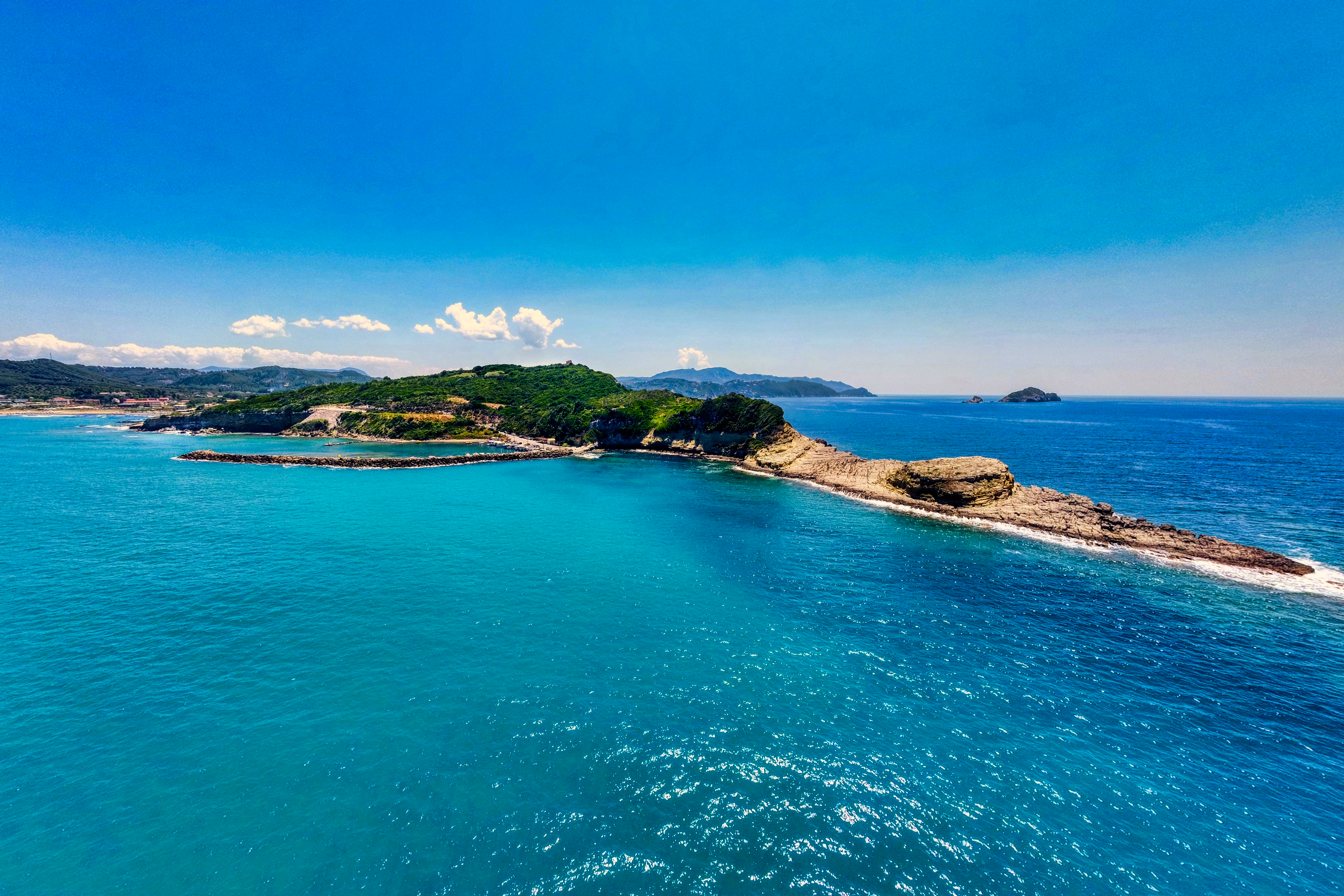
- Cape Kefali, near Avliotes

- Location within Greece
- Coordinates: 39°46′N 19°39′E
- Country: Greece
- Administrative region: Ionian Islands
- Regional unit: Corfu
- Municipality: North Corfu
- Municipal unit: Esperies
- Elevation: 120 m (390 ft)

Population (2021)
  - Community: 1,299
- Time zone: UTC+2 (EET)
  - Summer (DST): UTC+3 (EEST)
- Vehicle registration: ΚΥ

Avliotes (Greek: Αυλιώτες) is a mountain settlement lying at the northwest side of Corfu, Greece, 40 km from Corfu Town. It is a community of the municipal unit of Esperies. It is set 120m above sea level, against a background of green hills. Population 1,299 (2021).

== See also ==
- List of settlements in the Corfu regional unit
