= Agios Stefanos (Mykonos) =

Beach in Mykonos, Greece

Coordinates: 37°28′08″N 25°19′10″E

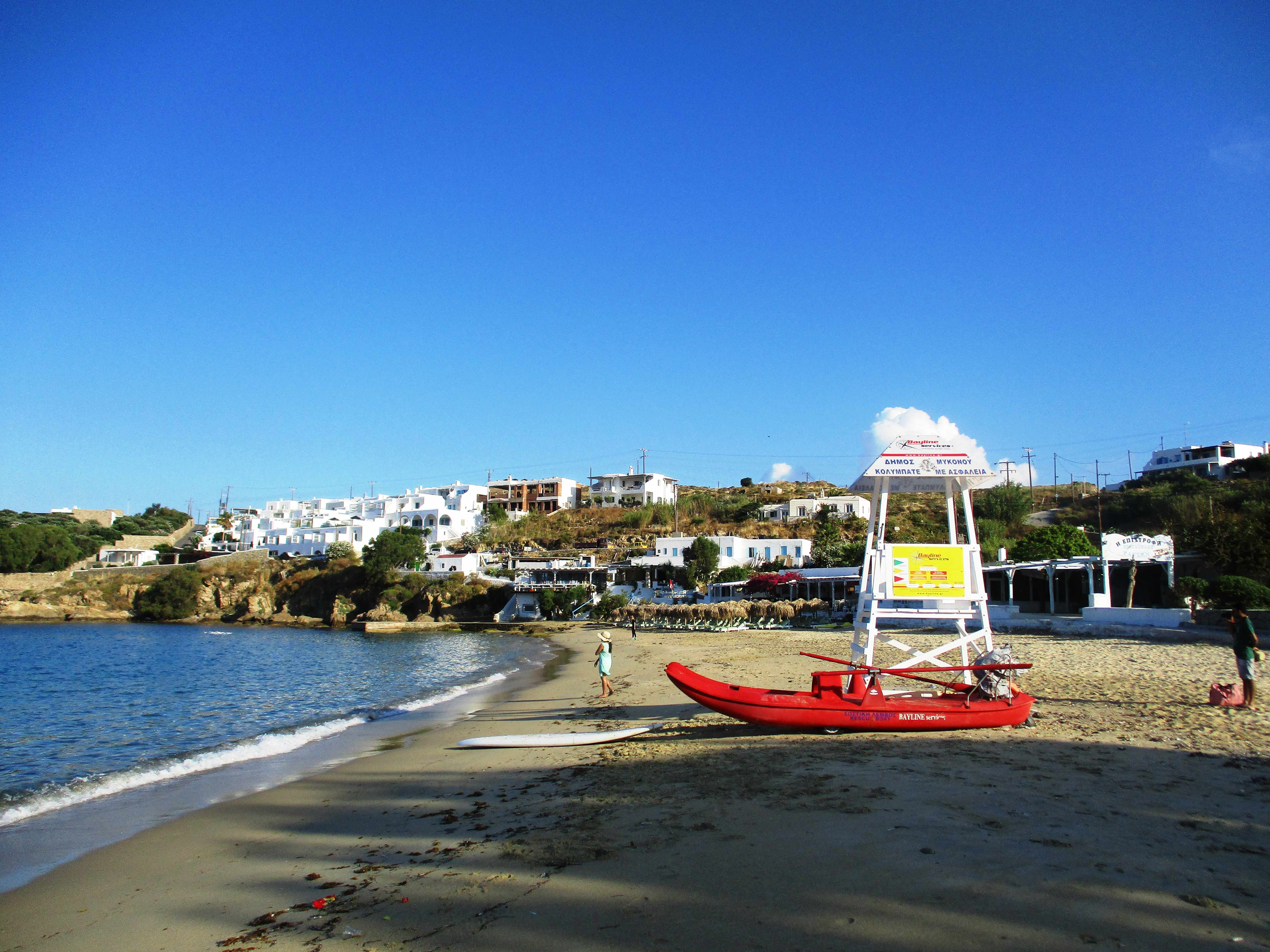
Agios Stefanos beach

Agios Stefanos (Gr. Άγιος Στέφανος meaning Saint Stephen) is a sandy beach next to Tourlos, the new harbor of Mykonos. It is located 3.5 km from Mykonos town. Agios Stefanos attracts a large number of tourists each summer since there are many facilities close to the beach. Visitors will find there sunbeds, umbrellas and most of water sports available at other Mykonian beaches as well. There are also many hotels that offer accommodation, while on the beach there is a great variety of restaurants and cafes to keep anyone satisfied. The beach can be reached via taxi, private vehicle or regular bus service from Mykonos town.
