= Perithia =

Village in Corfu, Greece

Coordinates: 39°45′53″N 19°52′31″E

Perithia, also called Palia Perithia (Old Perithia) is a village on the Greek island of Corfu, which was declared a monument in 1996. The town is located in the northeast of Corfu at the foothills of Mount Pantokrator.

== History ==
The first written records of Perithia date back to the 14th century. However, it is assumed that Perithia was inhabited for much longer. In its heyday, Perithia was one of the wealthiest places on the island and had up to 1,200 inhabitants. There were about 130 houses and eight churches.

The location of the town at about 450 meters originally offered protection from pirate attacks and the malaria that was rampant on the coast at that time. Livestock farming was an important industry, other agriculture was mainly only possible in fields in the lower coastal region. In the 19th century, there were hardly any pirate attacks and more and more people spent the winter on the coast and only the malaria-prone summer months in Palea Peritheia. The town was gradually abandoned in the 1960s after the risk of malaria on the Greek islands had been averted and tourism provided jobs on the coast.

The village is promoted as the abandoned place Palea Perithia (Παλαιά Περίθεια) and is now a tourist attraction. It has several taverns. Particularly worth seeing is the church of Agios Iakovos o Persis at the entrance to the village, which was built in the 14th century and contains remarkable frescoes. It was expertly restored from 2013 to 2014. The population of the village in the 2021 census counted 6 permanent inhabitants.
