= Mount Pantokrator =

Mountain in Greece

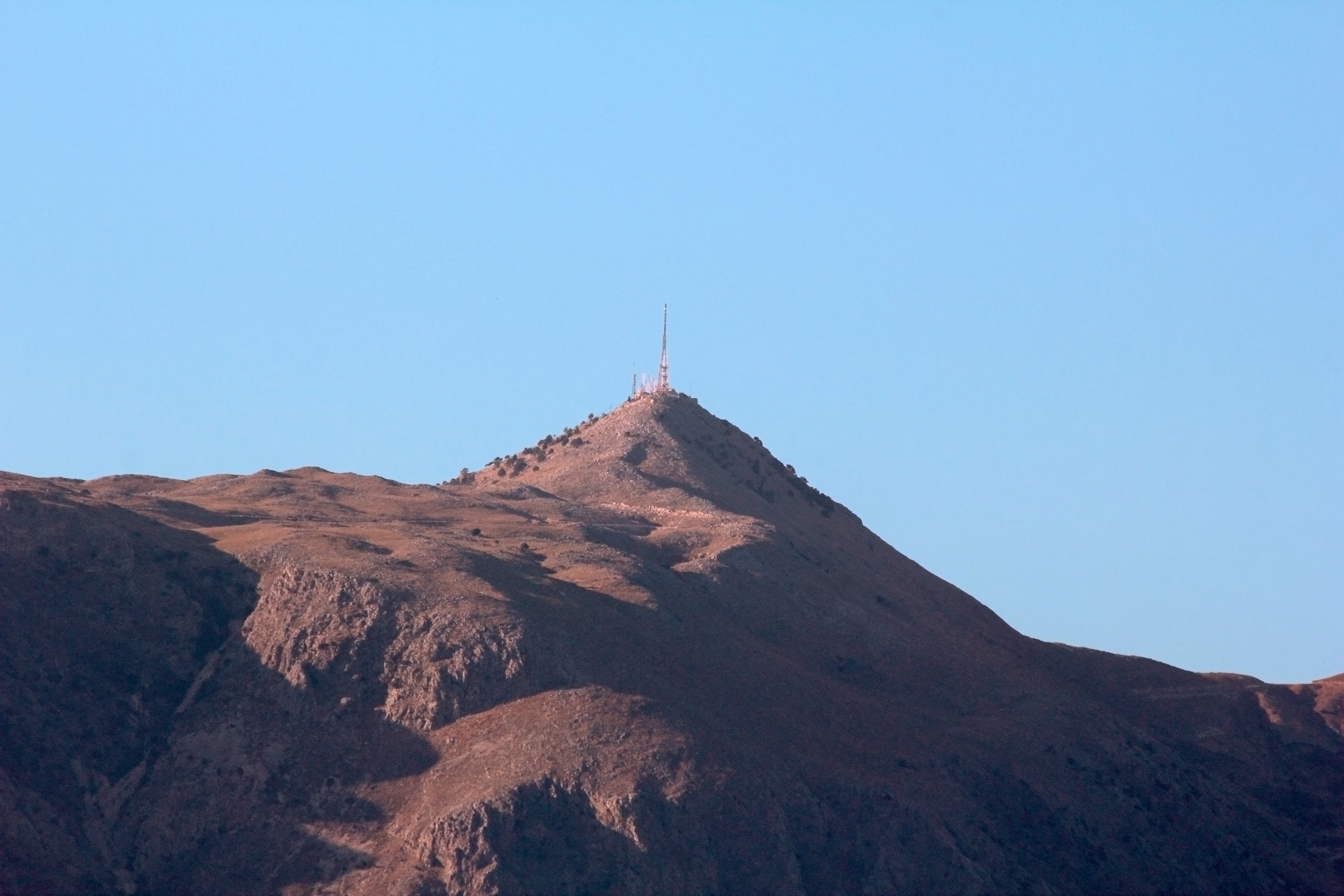
- Mount Pantokrator

Highest point
- Elevation: 906 m (2,972 ft)
- Prominence: 906 m (2,972 ft)
- Coordinates: 39°44′53″N 19°51′54″E

Geography
- Location: Northern Corfu

Mount Pantokrator (Greek: Παντοκράτωρ, romanised as Pantōkrator), sometimes called Pantocrator, is a mountain located in north-eastern Corfu. At 906 metres (2,972 ft), it is the highest mountain on the island. At the summit, the whole of Corfu can be seen, as well as Albania which lies a short distance from the island. On particularly clear days it is also possible to see Italy despite it being around 130 km (81 mi) away. At the top there is a café for tourists, a telecommunications station, whose largest tower stands directly over a well, and a monastery. The first monastery on the site was Angevin, built in 1347 but then destroyed sometime around 1537. The current church on the site dates from around 1689, and the current facade was built during the 19th century. It is dedicated to the transfiguration of Christ. The peak can be accessed by either driving up a series of winding roads from the coast or walking to the top. Old Perithia, Corfu's oldest village, can be found at the base of the mountain. It takes approximately 2 hours of walking for a round trip to the peak starting from Old Perthia. The village of Old Perithia dates back to the 14th century and the inhabitants helped build the original monastery using local wood and limestone. The village of Old Perithia (and the now abandoned village of Sinies) can be seen from Pantokrator and with its 130 house and 8 churches, Old Perithia is said to sit at the foot of Pantokrator, 'The Almighty'. The walk to Pantokrator from Spartilas is part of The Corfu Trail, an established long distance walking route of about 200 km from South to North Corfu.

== Gallery ==
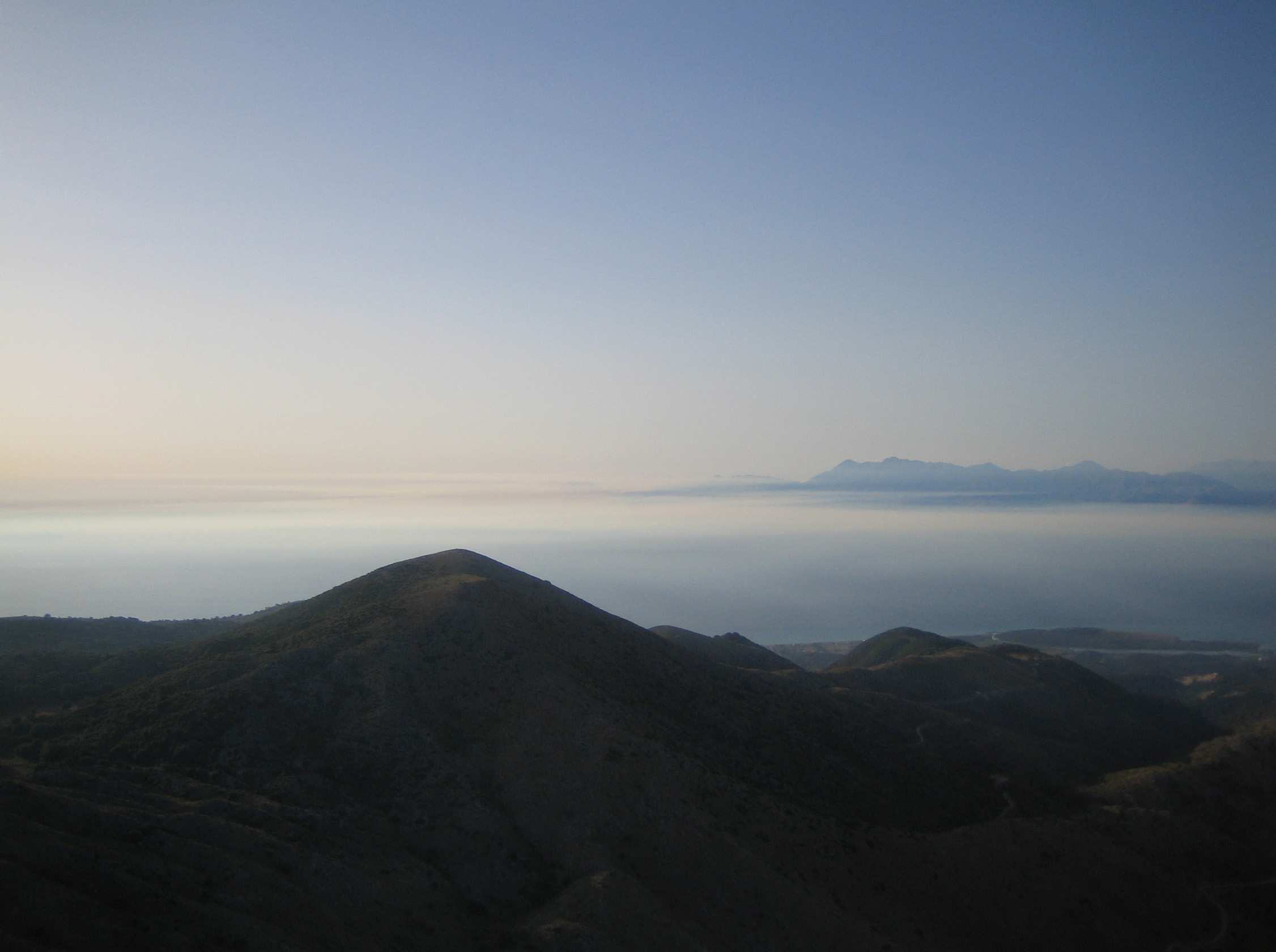
From the summit.

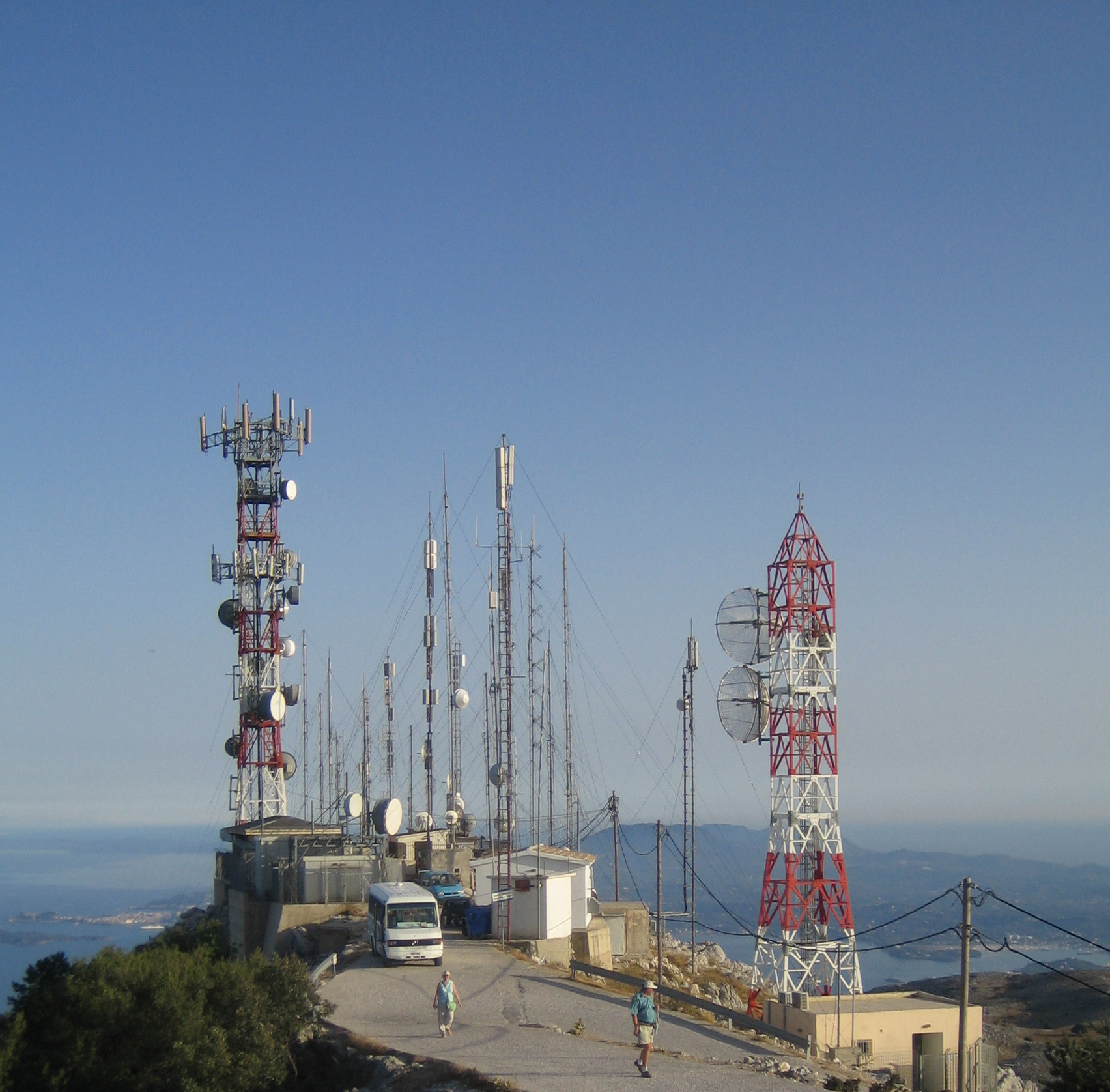
The communications station.

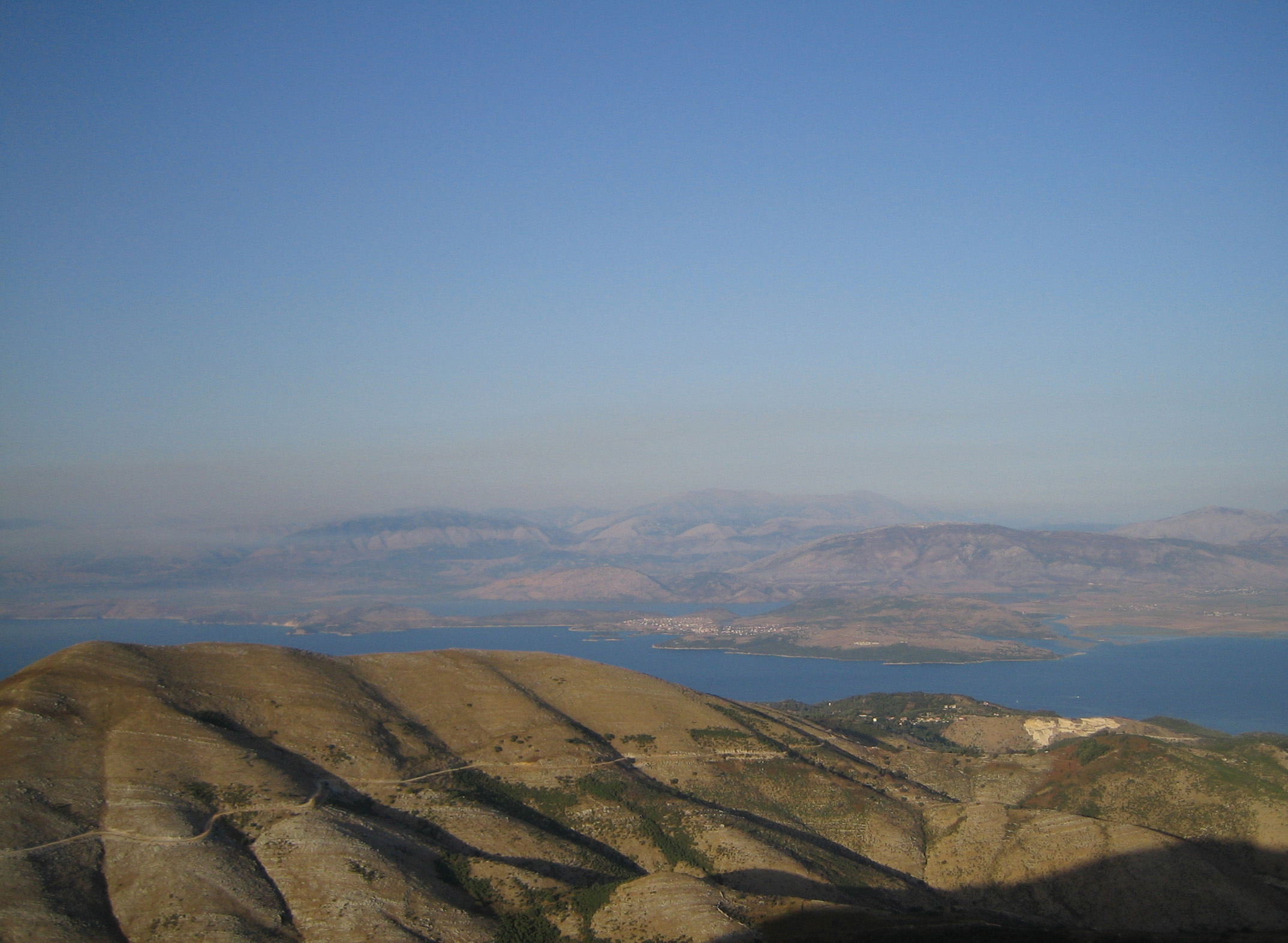
From Pantokrator looking east towards Albania
