= North Corfu =

North Corfu Βόρεια Κέρκυρα
- Municipality
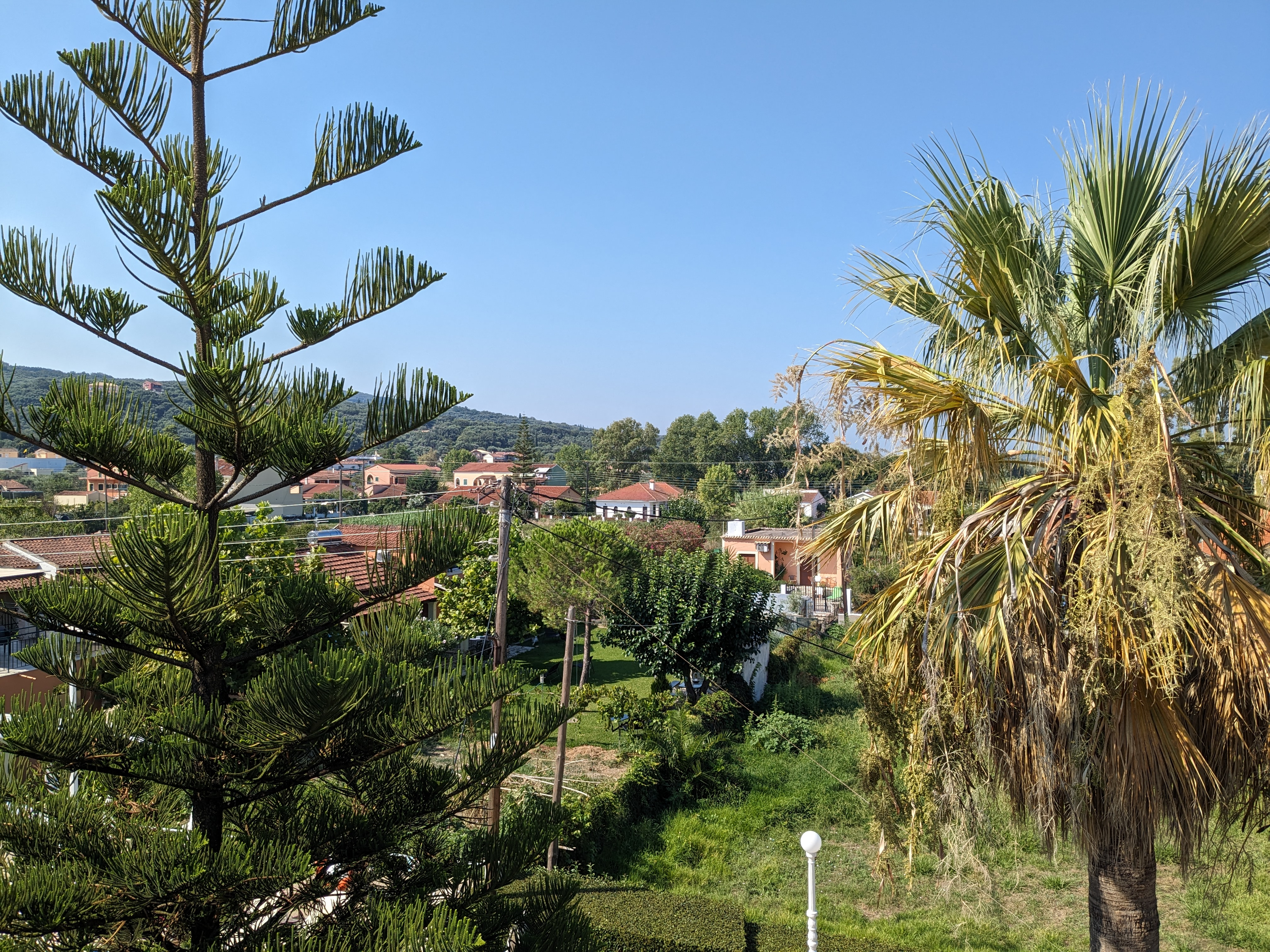
- Acharavi

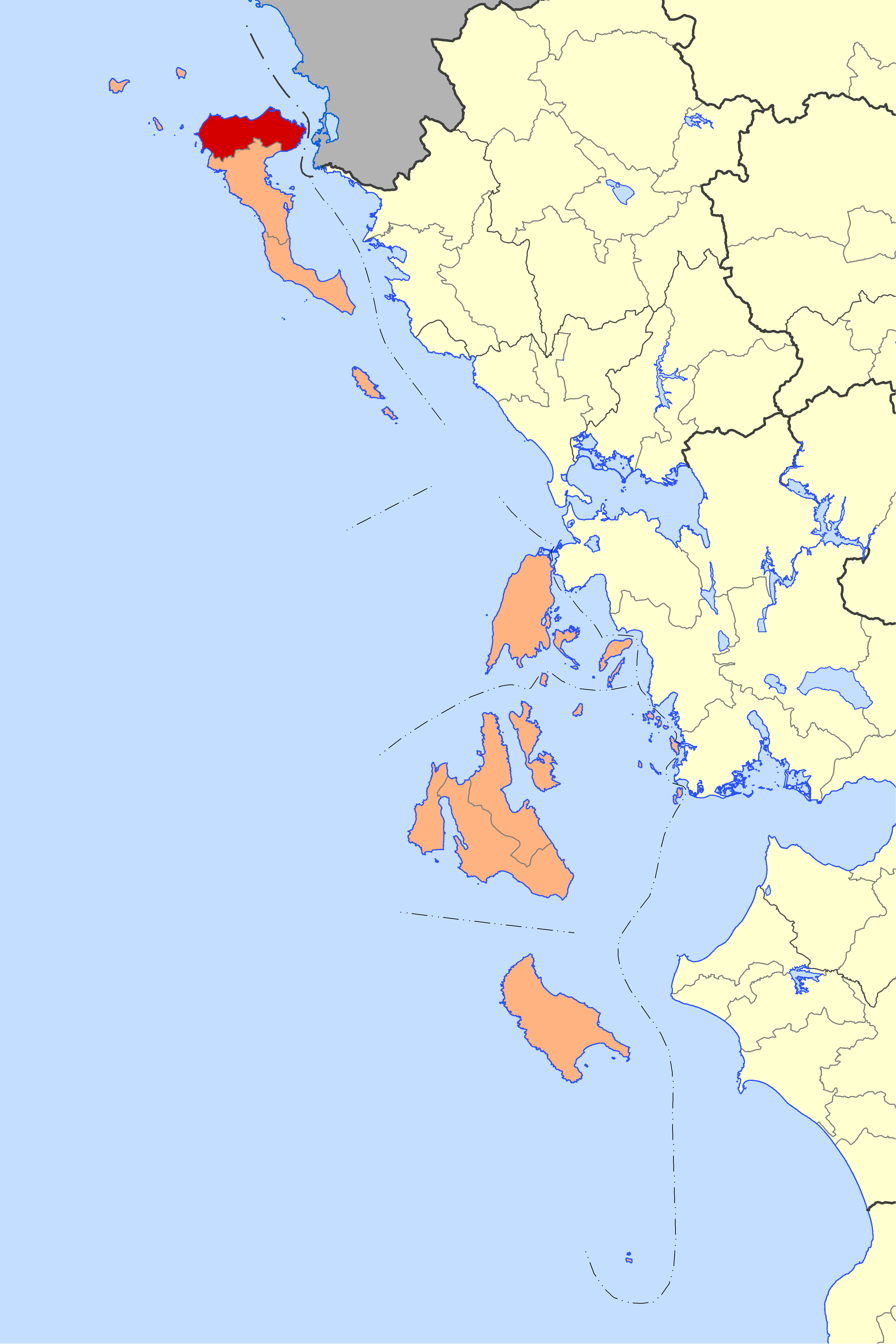

- Location within Greece
- Coordinates: 39°46′N 19°48′E
- Country: Greece
- Administrative region: Ionian Islands
- Regional unit: Corfu
- Seat: Acharavi

Area
  - Municipality: 205.3 km^{2} (79.3 sq mi)

Population (2021)
  - Municipality: 17,278
  - Density: 84.16/km^{2} (218.0/sq mi)
- Time zone: UTC+2 (EET)
  - Summer (DST): UTC+3 (EEST)

North Corfu (Greek: Βόρεια Κέρκυρα Voreia Kerkyra) is a municipality on the island of Corfu in the Ionian Islands region in Greece. The municipality was formed at the 2019 local government reform, when the pre-existing municipality of Corfu was divided in three. Its seat is the village Acharavi.

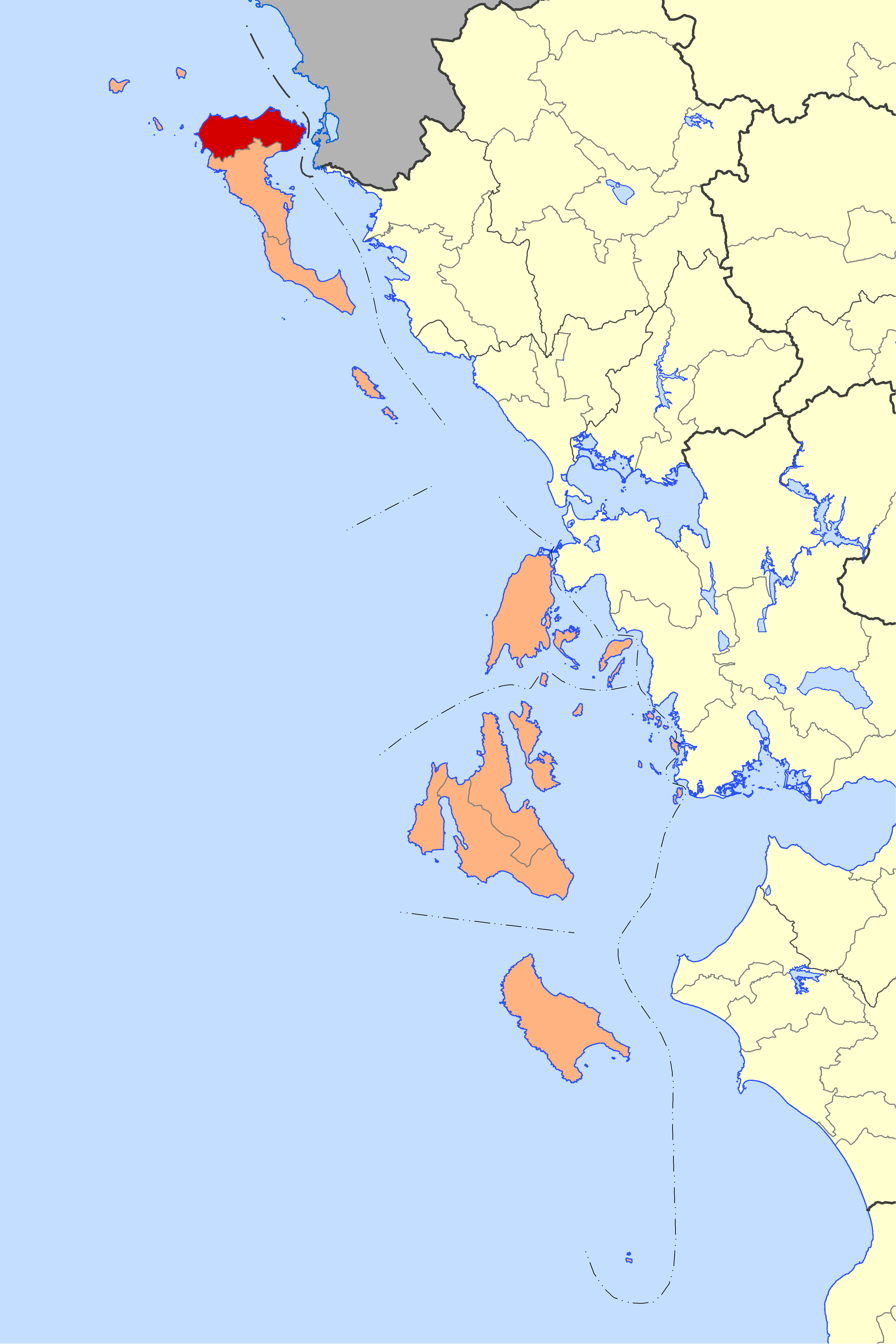
North Corfu is shown in red; the Ionian Islands Region is shown in orange

The municipality consists of the following four subdivisions (municipal units):

- Agios Georgios
- Esperies
- Kassopaia
- Thinali
