= Jordy (disambiguation) =

Jordy is a masculine given name.

Jordy may also refer to:

== People ==
- Jordy (French singer) (born 1988), French singer Jordy Lemoine
- Jordy (American singer), American singer-songwriter Jordy Shulman
- Carlos Jordy (born 1982), Brazilian politician
- Nicolas Louis Jordy (1758–1825), French general in the French Revolutionary Wars and Napoleonic Wars; see Army of the Rhine and Moselle
- William Jordy (1917–1997), American architectural historian

== Other uses ==
- JORDY (Joint Optical Reflective Display), electronic compensatory visual aid

== See also ==
- Jordi (disambiguation)
- Geordie (disambiguation)
