= Gordy (disambiguation) =

Gordy is a 1995 American family comedy-drama film.

Gordy or Gordie may also refer to:

== People with the given name or nickname ==
- Gordie Byers (1930–2001), Canadian ice hockey player
- Gordy Brown, American football player
- Gordy Ceresino (born 1957), American football player
- Gordie Clark (born 1952), Scottish ice hockey player
- Gordy Coleman (1934–1994), American baseball player
- Gordy Combs (born 1950), American football coach
- Gordie Drillon (1913–1986), Canadian ice hockey player
- Gordie Dwyer (born 1978), Canadian ice hockey player
- Gordy Foreman, Australian drummer
- Gordie Gillespie (1926–2015), American baseball, football and basketball coach
- Gordy Giovanelli (1925–2022), American rower
- Gary Gordon (1960–1993), United States Army soldier posthumously awarded the Medal of Honor
- Gordie Gosse (1955–2019), Canadian politician
- Gordy Gurson (born 1992), American soccer player
- Gordie Hall (born 1935), American water polo player
- Gordie C. Hanna (1903–1993), American agronomist
- Gordy Hoffman (born 1964), American screenwriter
- Gordie Howe (1928–2016), Canadian ice hockey player
- Gordie Ion, Canadian soccer player
- Gordie Johnson (born 1964), Canadian musician
- Gordon Johnson (musician) (born 1952), American bass guitarist
- Gordie Mitchell (born 1933), Canadian football player
- Gordie Mueller (1922–2006), American baseball player
- Gordie Pladson (born 1956), Canadian baseball player
- Gordie Roberts (born 1957), American ice hockey player
- Gordie Sampson (born 1971), Canadian singer, songwriter and producer
- Gordy Soltau (1925–2014), American football player
- Gordie Sundin (1937–2016), American baseball player
- Gordie Tapp (1922–2016), Canadian entertainer
- Gordie Windhorn (1933–2022), American baseball player

== People with the surname ==
- Gordy family, African-American family of businesspeople and music industry executives
- Anna Gordy Gaye (1922–2014), American businesswoman, composer and songwriter
- Berry Gordy (born 1929), American record producer and founder of Motown Records
- Emory Gordy Jr. (born 1944), American country musician and music producer
- Denise Gordy (born 1949), American actress
- Frank Gordy (died 1983), American restaurant owner
- Iris Gordy (born 1943), American songwriter, producer, and music executive
- John Gordy (1935–2009), pro football player and TV executive
- Josh Gordy (born 1987), American football player
- Kenneth William Gordy (born 1964), or Rockwell, American singer and songwriter
- Kerry Gordy (born 1959), American music industry executive
- Lillian Gordy Carter (1898–1983), American nurse and writer
- Matt Gordy (1909–1989), American pole vaulter
- Ray Gordy (born 1979), American wrestler
- Sarah Gordy (born 1970s), British actress
- Terry Gordy (1961–2001), American wrestler
- Robert Gordy (1931–2022), American music publishing executive and recording artist
- Skyler Austen Gordy (born 1986), or Sky Blu, American rapper, producer and dancer
- Stefan Leiviska Gordy (born 1975), or Redfoo, American rapper, DJ and singer
- Stephen E. Gordy (1920–2004), American politician, military officer and educator
- W. J. Gordy (1910–1993), American potter
- Walter Gordy (1909–1985), American physicist

== Fictional characters with the name ==
- Gordy Howard, a recurring character on the TV series The Mary Tyler Moore Show
- Gordy, a character on the TV series Ned's Declassified School Survival Guide
- Gordy, the chimpanzee character from the 2022 film Nope
- Elspeth Gordie, main character of Isobelle Carmody's Obernewtyn Chronicles novel series
- Gordie, one of the Gym Leaders in Pokémon Sword and Shield

== Other uses ==
- Gordy Records, a Motown record label
- The Gordie Foundation, a non-profit organization focussing on alcohol and hazing education

== See also ==
- Gordon (given name)
- Geordie (disambiguation)
- Gordias, royal name in the mythic prehistory of Phrygia
- Gordis (disambiguation)
