= Yordi (given name) =

Yordi is a male given name. People with the name include:

- Jorge "Yordi" González (born 1974), Spanish footballer
- Yordi Meeuwisse (born 1988), Dutch darts player
- Yordi Rosado (born 1971), Mexican television host
- Yordi Teijsse (born 1992), Dutch footballer
- Yordy Reyna (born 1993), Peruvian footballer

== See also ==
Similar names include:

- Geordi
- Jordi
- Jordy
