= Gordis =

Gordis may refer to:

- Agios Gordis, holiday resort in Corfu, Greece
- Robert Gordis, leader in Conservative Judaism

== See also ==
- Gordy (disambiguation)
