= Parelioi =

Parelioi Παρέλιοι
- Municipal unit
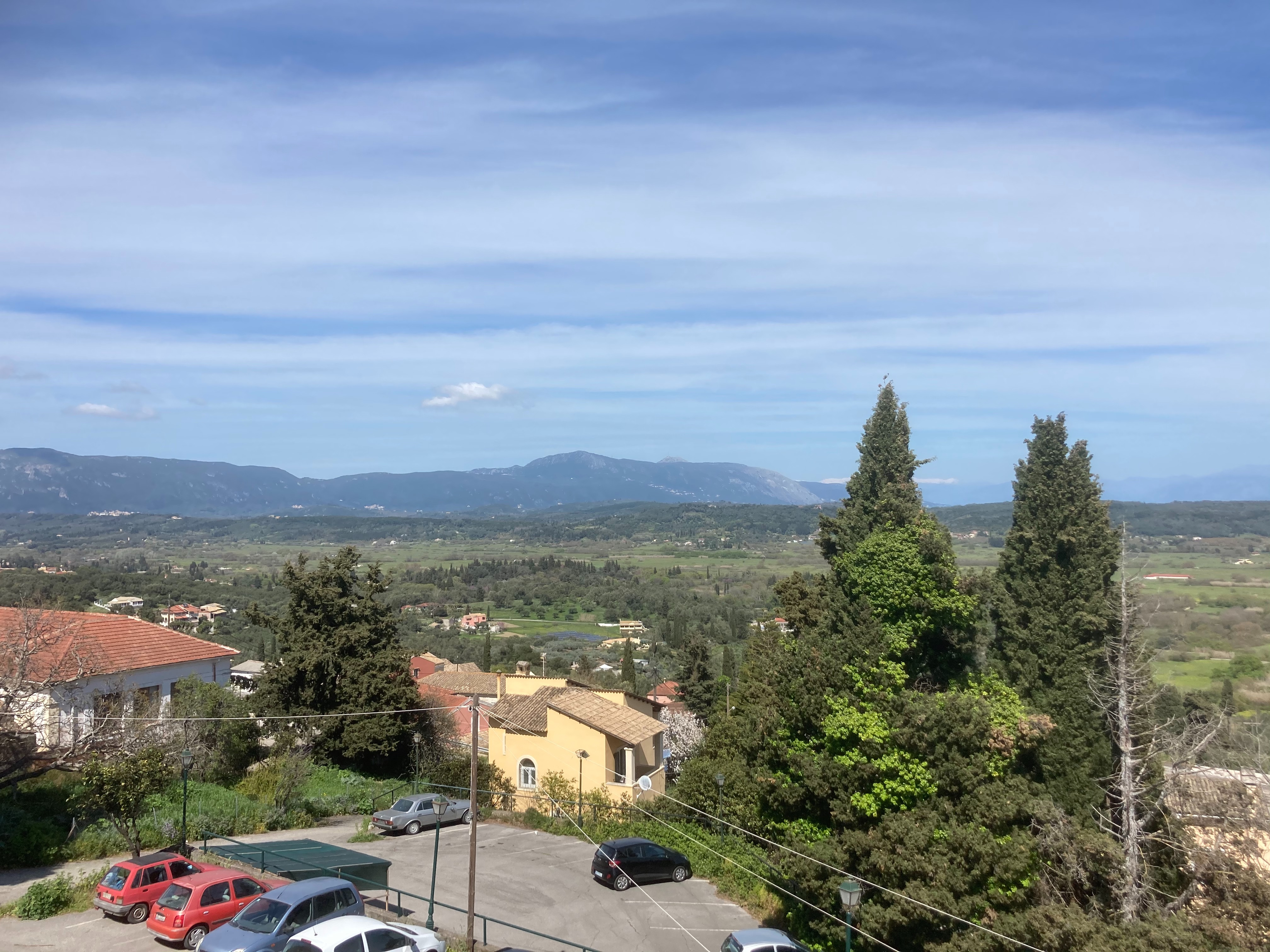
- Giannades

- Location within the regional unit

- Location within Greece
- Coordinates: 39°36′N 19°49′E
- Country: Greece
- Administrative region: Ionian Islands
- Regional unit: Corfu
- Municipality: Central Corfu and Diapontia Islands

Area
  - Municipal unit: 49.0 km^{2} (18.9 sq mi)

Population (2021)
  - Municipal unit: 6,751
  - Municipal unit density: 138/km^{2} (357/sq mi)
- Time zone: UTC+2 (EET)
  - Summer (DST): UTC+3 (EEST)
- Vehicle registration: ΚΥ

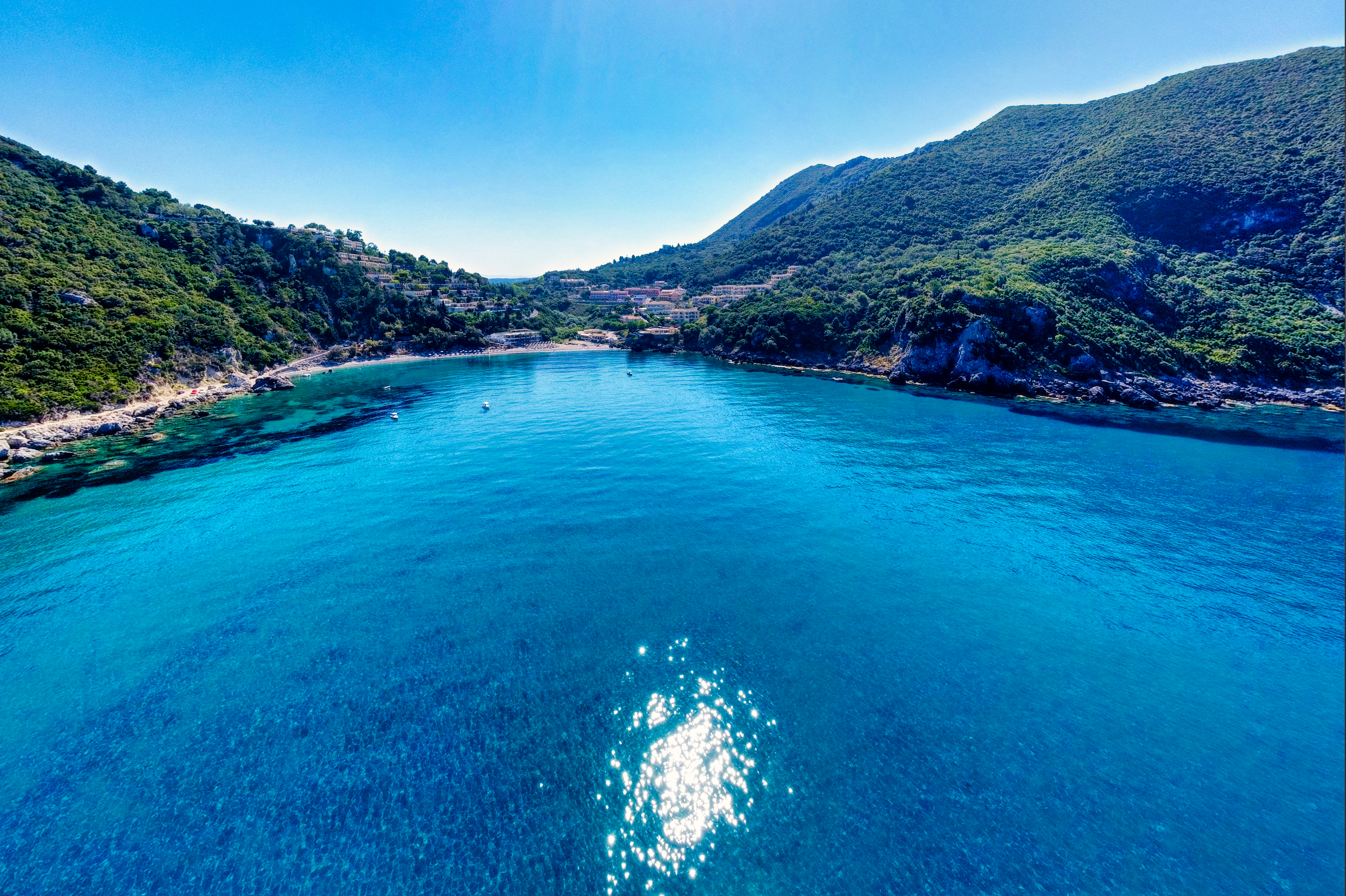
Ermones Beach, Giannades

Parelioi (Greek: Παρέλιοι) is a former municipality on the island of Corfu, Ionian Islands, Greece. Since the 2019 local government reform it is part of the municipality Central Corfu and Diapontia Islands, of which it is a municipal unit. It is located on the central west coast of the island of Corfu. It has a land area of 48.990 square kilometres (18.92 sq mi) and a population of 6,751 (2021 census). The seat of the municipality was the town of Kokkini.

== Subdivisions ==
The municipal unit Parelioi is subdivided into the following communities (constituent villages in brackets):

- Kokkini
- Agios Ioannis (Agios Ioannis, Agia Triada, Kouramaditika, Vasilika)
- Afra (Afra, Agios Vlasios, Kourkoulaiika)
- Vatos
- Giannades (Giannades, Ermones)
- Kanakades
- Kompitsi
- Marmaro
- Pelekas (Pelekas, Avramis, Agios Onoufrios, Glyfada, Kokkinogeia, Plakoto)
- Sinarades (Sinarades, Aspai, Kontogialos)

== Population ==
Year	Population
1991	6,180
2001	7,196
2011	6,403
2021	6,751

== Tourism ==
The economy of Parelioi is mainly based on tourism. There are beaches in Agios Gordis, Glyfada, Kondogialos and Ermones. The Historic and Folklore Museum of Central Corfu is located in Sinarades. Aqualand, the third largest water park in Europe, is situated in Agios Ioannis.
