= Kokkini, Corfu =

Kokkini Κοκκίνι
- Community
- Location within Greece
- Coordinates: 39°36.5′N 19°48.9′E
- Country: Greece
- Administrative region: Ionian Islands
- Regional unit: Corfu
- Municipality: Central Corfu and Diapontia Islands
- Municipal unit: Parelioi

Population (2021)
  - Community: 566
- Time zone: UTC+2 (EET)
  - Summer (DST): UTC+3 (EEST)
- Vehicle registration: ΚΥ

Kokkini (Greek: Κοκκίνι) is a village in the central part of the island of Corfu, Greece. It was the municipal seat of Parelioi. Kokkini is located 5 km (3 mi) southwest of Giannades and 9 km (6 mi) west of the city of Corfu. The village is situated on a low hill, between forests and farmlands.

== Population ==
Year	Population
1981	269
1991	373
2001	733
2011	580
2021	566

== See also ==
- List of settlements in the Corfu regional unit
