= Geordie (given name) =

Geordie is a masculine given name. It may also be a nickname for people named George or associated with the Tyneside area of North East England.

Notable people known as Geordie include:

- George Armstrong (footballer) (1944–2000), English football player and coach
- George P. Anderson (1885–1958), Australian rules footballer
- George Best (1946–2005), Northern Irish footballer
- Geordie Bourne (died 1597), Scottish thief or raider
- Ralph Bullock (jockey) (1841–1863), Derby-winning British jockey
- Geordie Cassidy (1936-2023), jazz musician
- Geordie Dewar (1867–1915), Scottish footballer
- George Douglas-Hamilton, 10th Earl of Selkirk (1906–1994), Scottish Second World War Royal Air Force officer and politician
- George Drummond (footballer, born 1865) (1865–1914), Scottish footballer
- Geordie Greig (born 1960), English journalist and editor of The Mail on Sunday
- Geordie Greep (born 1999), English musician
- Geordie Hormel (1928–2006), American music composer and recording studio proprietor
- George Ker, Scottish footballer of the 1870s and 1880s
- Geordie Lyall (born 1976), Canadian soccer player
- Geordie Neave (fl. 1895–1896), English footballer
- Geordie Newman (fl. 1927), English-born New Zealand footballer
- Geordie Reid (1882–1960), Scottish footballer
- Geordie Richardson (1835–1905), English-born New Zealand merchant, entrepreneur and ship owner
- George "Geordie" Ridley (1835–1864), English concert hall song writer and performer
- Geordie Stewart (born 1989), British author and mountaineer
- Geordie Walker (1958–2023), British-American guitarist with the post-punk group Killing Joke
- a mocking nickname for King George I of Great Britain in the folksong "Cam Ye O'er Frae France"

== See also ==
- Geordi, given name
- Geordy, given name
- Jordi
- Jordie
- Jordy
