= Jordie =

Jordie is a given name and a nickname of the name Jordan (name). Notable people with the name include:

- Jordie Albiston (1961–2022), Australian poet and academic
- Jordie Barrett (born 1997), New Zealand rugby union player
- Jordie Bellaire (born 1988), American comic book colorist
- Jordie Benn (born 1987), Canadian ice hockey player
- Jordie Briels (born 1991), Dutch football midfielder
- Jordie Ireland (born 1997), Australian musician
- Jordie McKenzie (born 1990), Australian rules footballer
- Jordie van der Laan (born 1993), Dutch football player

== See also ==
- Geordie (given name)
- Jordi
- Jordy
- Jordan (name)
