= Geordi =

Geordi is a given name. People and characters with the name include:

- Geordi La Forge, fictional character who appeared in the American science fiction television series Star Trek: The Next Generation
- Geordi Peats (born 1969), Australian rugby league footballer
- Geordi Demorest (born 1992), Canadian writer
- Geordi Helmick (born 1994), American artist

== See also ==
- Geordie (given name)
- Geordy, given name
- Jordi, given name
