= Nathan Peats =

Australian professional rugby league footballer

Nathan "Peatsy" Peats
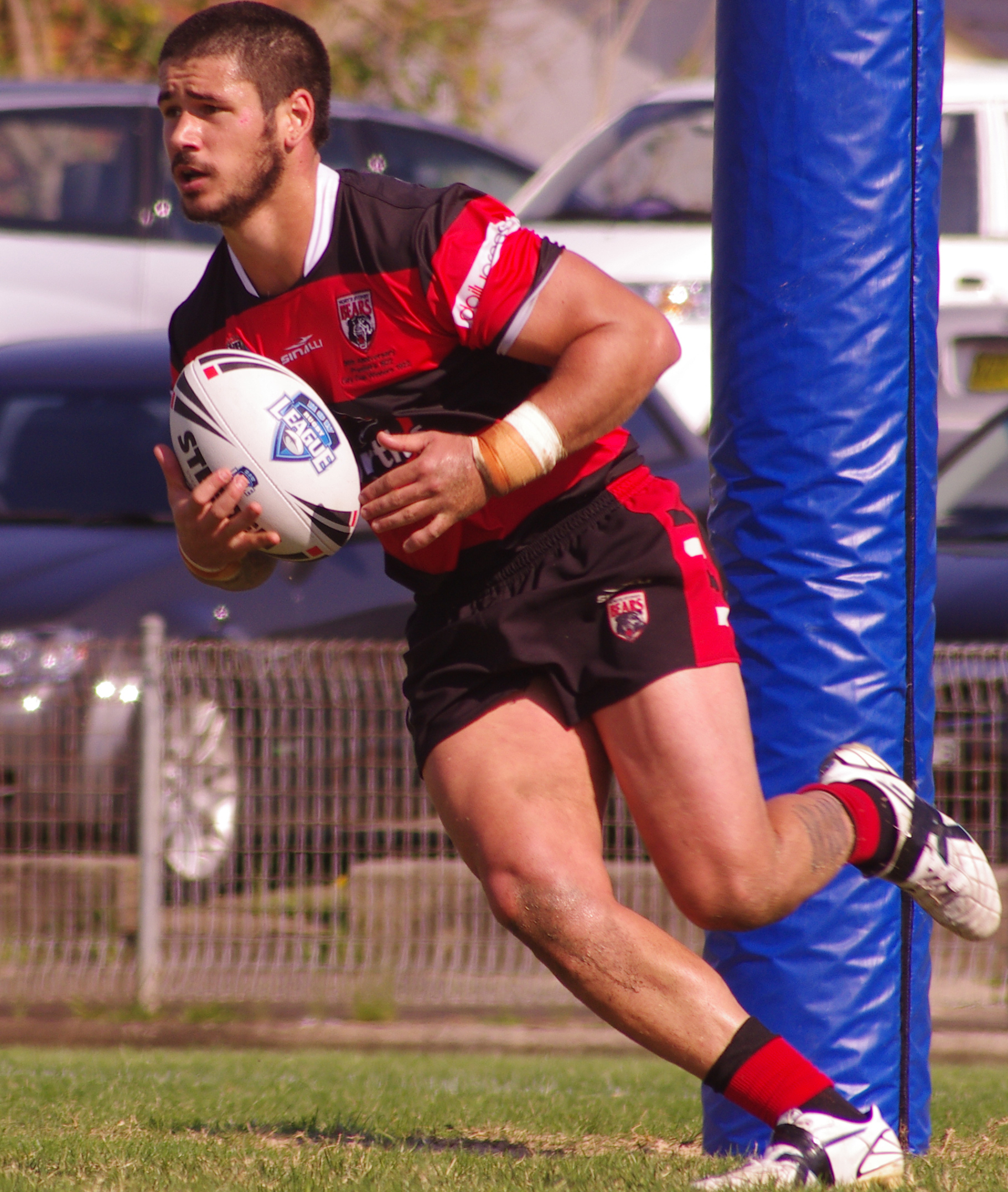

Personal information
- Full name: Nathan Peats
- Born: 5 October 1990 (age 36) Camperdown, New South Wales, Australia

Playing information
- Height: 5 ft 11 in (1.81 m)
- Weight: 14 st 5 lb (91 kg)
- Position: Hooker
Club
Years	Team	Pld	T	G	FG	P
2011–13	South Sydney	54	6	0	0	24
2014–16	Parramatta Eels	35	8	0	0	32
2016–20	Gold Coast Titans	70	2	0	0	8
2021	Leigh Centurions	11	1	0	0	4
2021(loan)	→ Huddersfield Giants	12	1	0	0	4
2022	RC Albi	13	2	0	0	4
2022	Toulouse Olympique	13	2	0	0	8
2023	Huddersfield Giants	25	0	0	0	0
	Total	233	22	0	0	84
Representative
Years	Team	Pld	T	G	FG	P
2012–20	Indigenous All Stars	5	0	0	0	0
2013–16	NSW City Origin	3	1	0	0	4
2017	New South Wales	3	0	0	0	0
2021	Combined Nations All Stars	1	0	0	0	0
- Father: Geordi Peats

Nathan Peats (born 5 October 1990) is an Australian former professional rugby league footballer who played as a hooker for Tugun Seahawks in the Gold Coast Rugby League.

Peats previously played for the South Sydney Rabbitohs, Parramatta Eels and the Gold Coast Titans in the NRL. He has played at representative level for the Indigenous All Stars, City Origin and New South Wales in the State of Origin series.

== Background ==
Peats was born in Camperdown, New South Wales, Australia and is of Greek and Indigenous Australian descent. Peats is eligible to play for Greece, the son of a former Canterbury-Bankstown Bulldogs and South Sydney Rabbitohs player, Geordi Peats.

Peats played his junior football for the La Perouse Panthers, going through the South Sydney Rabbitohs junior ranks and attended Christian Brothers' High School, Lewisham.

== Club career ==
Peats played in South Sydney's NYC team in 2009–2010 where he even captained the team in 2010 helping the team make it into the 2010 Toyota Cup Grand Final against the Junior New Zealand Warriors but lost 42–28.

=== 2011 ===
In round 4, Peats made his NRL debut for South Sydney against the Manly-Warringah Sea Eagles, off the interchange bench in the 32–30 win at Central Coast Stadium. In Round 21 against the St. George Illawarra Dragons, Peats scored his first NRL try in the comeback 34–24 win after being down 20–0 after 35 minutes at WIN Stadium. On 28 August, Peats re-signed with the South Sydney club until the end of the 2013 season. He finished his debut year playing in 20 matches and scoring a try in the 2011 NRL season.

=== 2012 ===
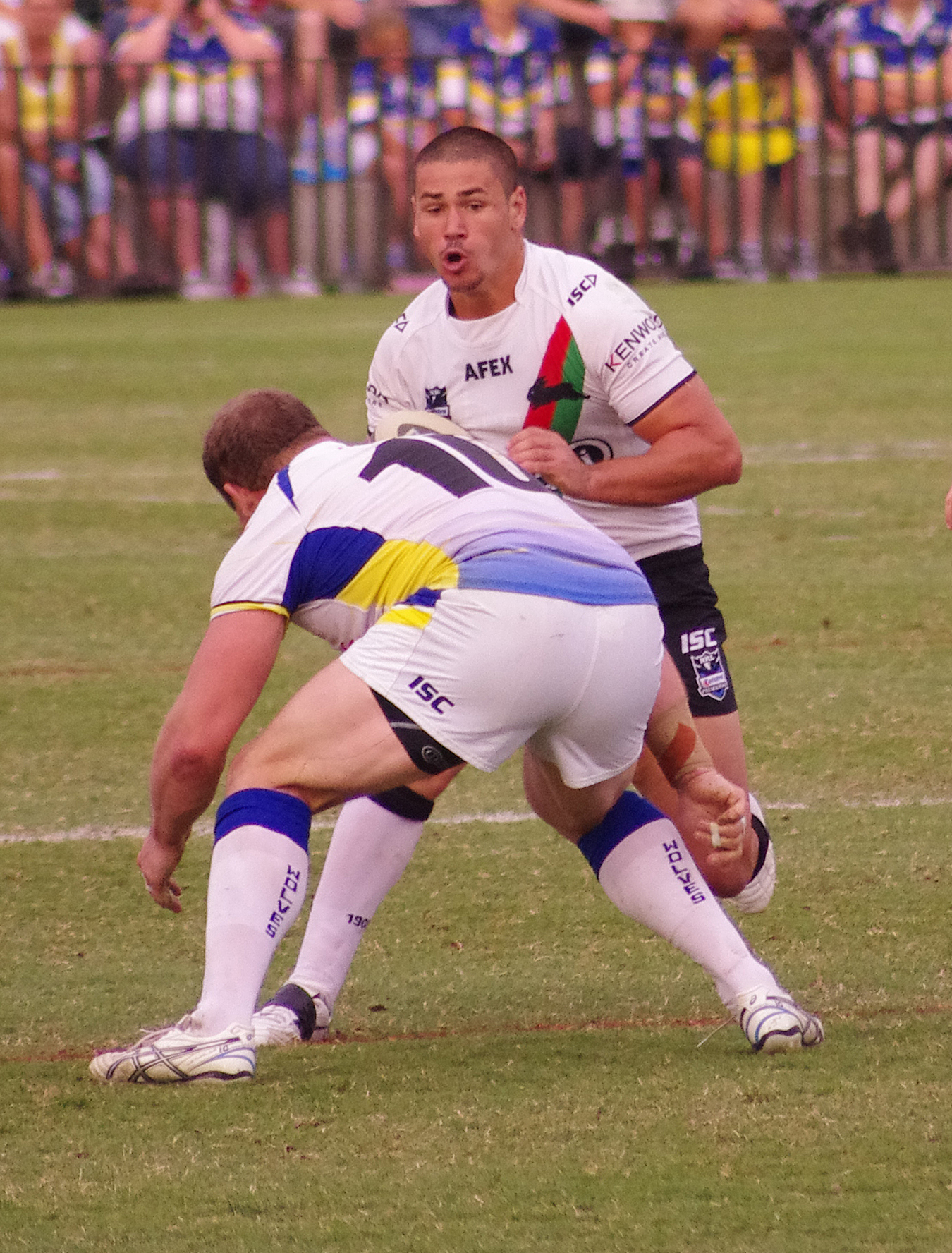
Peats playing for the South Sydney Rabbitohs in 2012

On 4 February, Peats played for the Indigenous All Stars against the NRL All Stars. After South Sydney's 20–12 loss against the Brisbane Broncos in round 4, Peats was dropped to Souths NSW Cup team, the North Sydney Bears, where he played round 15. After round 15, Peats remained his spot in the top 17 for the rest of the season, starting at hooker in most of the matches. Peats finished the 2012 NRL season with him playing in 18 matches and scoring five tries.

=== 2013 ===
Peats again played for the Indigenous All Stars in the pre-season. On 13 March, he re-signed with the South Sydney club until the end of the 2015 season. On 21 April, Peats played for the New South Wales City Origin team against the Country Origin team where he started at hooker in the 12–18 loss at Coffs Harbour. On 24 June, three months after signing a contract extension with the club, Peats went on to sign a three-year deal with the Parramatta Eels starting in 2014. Peats commented on his signing saying, "it was a tough decision, the biggest of my life. I'm a Souths junior and love the club to death but to further my career I believe it's what's best for me, There is a long way to go before the season is over and I'm fully committed to Souths and having a year to remember".

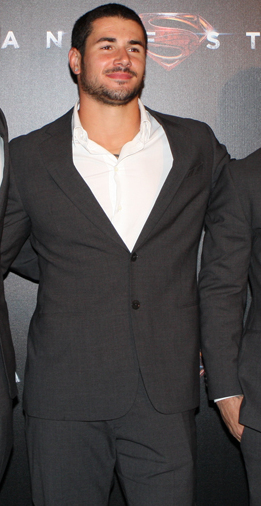
Peats at the Man of Steel premiere in Sydney in 2013

After round 22, where the South Sydney side lost 26–8 against the Melbourne Storm, Peats was demoted to the NSW Cup and didn't feature in any more matches for the South Sydney club for the remainder of the season. He played in 17 matches in the 2013 NRL season.

=== 2014 ===
In February, Peats was selected in the Eels Auckland Nines squad. In round 1, he made his debut for Parramatta, against the New Zealand Warriors, playing at hooker in the 36–16 win at Parramatta Stadium. In round 2, against the Manly-Warringah Sea Eagles, Peats scored his first try for Parramatta in the 18–22 loss. After good early season form, his name was thrown up with others as a potential replacement for the injured Robbie Farah at hooker for New South Wales. Unfortunately, in round 12 against the Penrith Panthers, Peats suffered a season ending anterior cruciate ligament (ACL) knee injury. Despite his season being cut short early, Peats was branded "one of the best buys of the year". He finished his first year for the Parramatta club with 10 matches and three tries.

=== 2015 ===
On 3 May, Peats returned as hooker for City Origin. In round 23, against the Sydney Roosters, he suffered a season ending neck injury in the 18–28 loss at the Sydney Football Stadium. He scored four tries in his 19 matches for the Parramatta side.

=== 2016 ===
On 8 May, Peats made his third appearance at hooker for the City Origin team. On 11 May, following the Parramatta Eels salary cap breach, Peats joined the Gold Coast Titans effective immediately on a contract to the end of 2017, after he was asked to leave to help get the Parramatta club back under the salary cap. Peats finished his time with Parramatta in the middle of the season, playing in six matches and scoring a try. After being asked to leave by Parramatta, Peats spoke to the media about his displeasure with the club by saying "The only regret I probably have is with myself and the things I've done during the games, "I've got my body in the wrong spot a few times for the club, for myself and for the boys and I regret that at times because now look at it, I'm the one walking away, It's been a poorly run business to be honest in the last couple of years ... until they sort that stuff out I think it's going to keep continuing, No-one's going to say sorry so it is what it is, I don't really care. I'm looking forward to moving on. What's a sorry going to do?"

In round 11, Peats made his debut for the Gold Coast Titans against the Penrith Panthers, playing off the interchange bench and scoring a try in the 28–24 win at Penrith Stadium. He scored two tries in his 14 matches for the Gold Coast.

=== 2017 ===
On 10 February 2016, Peats started at hooker for the Indigenous All Stars against the World All Stars in the 34–8 win at Hunter Stadium. and made his State of Origin debut on 31 May for the NSW Blues at Suncorp Stadium against the Queensland Maroons. Peats re-signed with the Gold Coast outfit until the end of the 2020 season.

=== 2018 ===
Peats made 20 appearances for the Gold Coast in 2018 as the club missed out on the finals finishing in 14th position. Peats also missed out on origin selection in 2018 with coach Brad Fittler opting to select Damien Cook as hooker.

=== 2019 ===
In round 24 2019, Peats played his 150th NRL game in the Gold Coast's 38–4 loss to the Newcastle Knights at McDonald Jones Stadium. Peats made a total of 13 appearances for the Gold Coast in 2019 as the club endured a horror year on and off the field winning only 4 matches all season and claiming the wooden spoon after finishing last.

=== 2020 ===
Peats played eight games for the Gold Coast in the 2020 NRL season. Following the conclusion of the season, Peats was released by the Gold Coast.

=== 2021 ===
On 22 March 2021, it was reported that he had signed for Leigh in the Super League. On 11 July 2021, it was reported that he had signed for the Huddersfield Giants in the Super League on a season-long loan. In round 15 of the 2021 Super League season, he scored his first try for Huddersfield in a 40–26 victory over Hull F.C. On 18 November 2021, it was reported that he had signed for Racing Club Albi XIII in the Elite One Championship.

=== 2022 ===
On 27 May, Peats signed a two-year deal to join Toulouse Olympique. In late 2022 after the club was relegated from the Super League, Peats requested a release from his Toulouse Olympique contract to join Huddersfield ahead of the 2023 Super League season.

=== 2023 ===
On 20 September, Peats announced he would be retiring from rugby league at the end of the 2023 Super League season.

== International ==
On 25 June 2021, he played for the Combined Nations All Stars in their 26–24 victory over England, staged at the Halliwell Jones Stadium, Warrington, as part of England's 2021 Rugby League World Cup preparation.

== Post-playing career ==
In December 2024 it was report he had taken the role of Community Development Officer at Tweed Heads Seagulls.
