= Pelekas =

Pelekas Πέλεκας
- Community
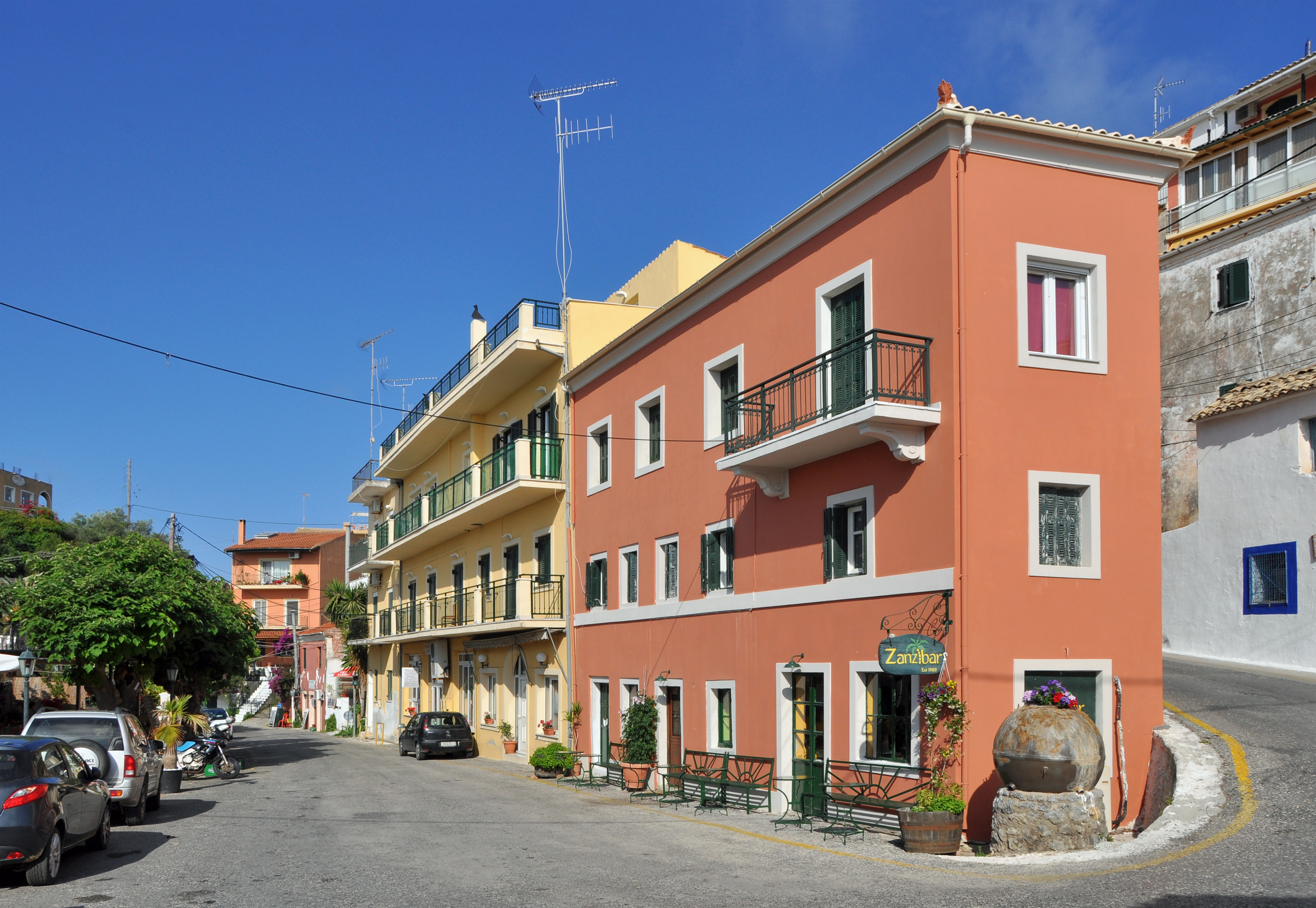

- Location within Greece
- Coordinates: 39°36′N 19°49′E
- Country: Greece
- Administrative region: Ionian Islands
- Regional unit: Corfu
- Municipality: Central Corfu and Diapontia Islands
- Municipal unit: Parelioi

Population (2021)
  - Community: 647
- Time zone: UTC+2 (EET)
  - Summer (DST): UTC+3 (EEST)
- Vehicle registration: ΚΥ

Pelekas (Greek: Πέλεκας) is a village and a community in the central part of the island of Corfu, Greece. It is part of the municipal unit of Parelioi. Pelekas is located southwest of the city of Corfu.

== Settlements ==
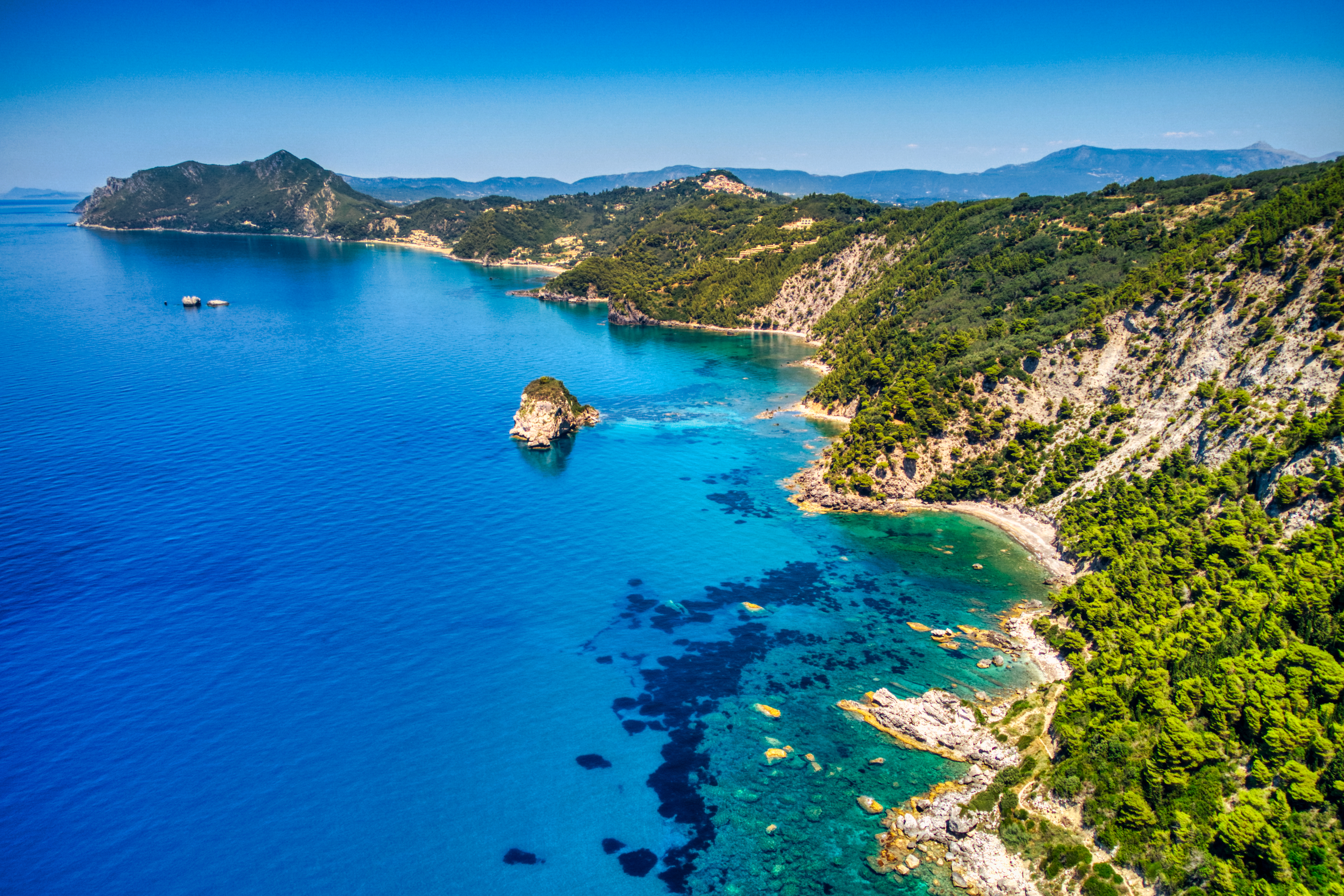
The bay near Pelekas

The community Pelekas consists of the following villages:

- Pelekas
- Agios Onoufrios
- Avramis
- Glyfada
- Kokkinogeia
- Plakoto

== Population ==
Year	Settlement population	Community population
1981	637	-
1991	512	-
2001	565	841
2011	405	612
2021	373	647

== See also ==
- List of settlements in the Corfu regional unit
