= Geordy =

Geordy is a given name. People and characters with the name include:

- Geordy Black, eponymous miner in folk song "Geordy Black"

== See also ==
- Geordi, given name
- Geordie (given name)
- Jordy, given name
