= Maria Antònia Canals =

Catalan teacher (1930–2022)

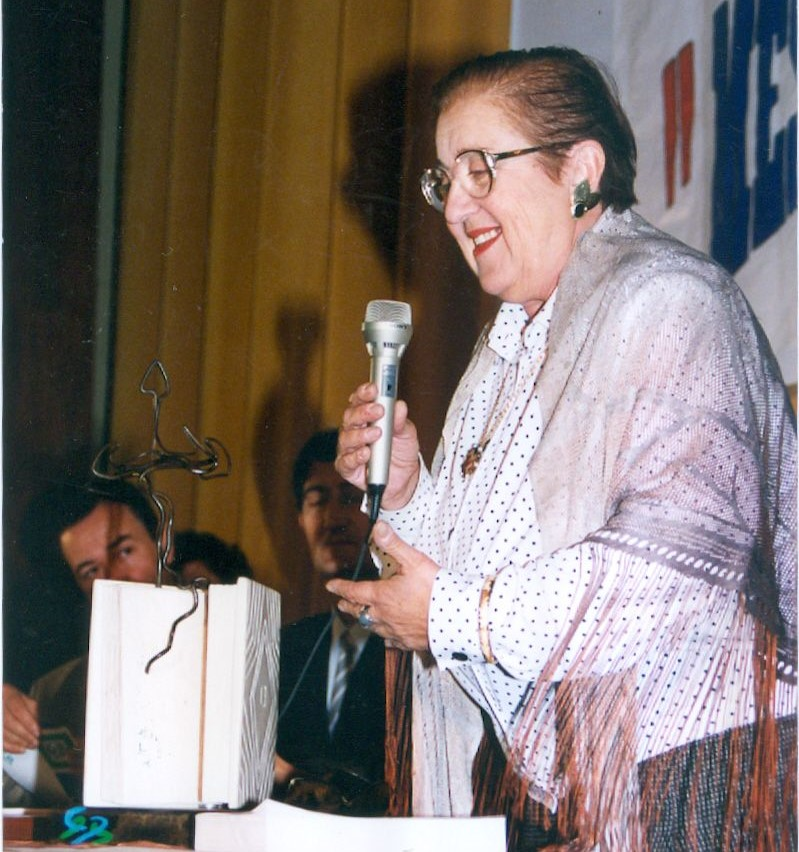
- 1994
- Born: Maria Antònia Canals i Tolosa; 15 November 1930; Barcelona, Spain
- Died: 29 April 2022 (aged 91)
- Education: University of Barcelona
- Occupations: Teacher, mathematician
- Employer: Autonomous University of Barcelona
- Known for: Recreational mathematics
- Awards: Medal of Merit at Work (1986); Creu de Sant Jordi (2006); Medal of Honor of Barcelona (2009)

Maria Antònia Canals (15 November 1930 – 29 April 2022) was a Spanish mathematician. Her work in recreational mathematics served as the basis for the eponymous Canals Project. Among other honors, she has been awarded the Creu de Sant Jordi and the Medal of Honor of Barcelona.

== Biography ==
María Antònia Canals completed her teaching studies in 1950, and three years later earned a licentiate in exact sciences at the University of Barcelona. She began working at the Lycée Français and at the Talitha School. From 1956 to 1962, she implemented a method of pedagogical renewal in early childhood education, following the Montessori model. As part of that task, she devoted herself to the creation of all necessary materials in the field of mathematical games.

In October 1962 she founded the Ton i Guida school, working in an area of Barcelona with a need for greater attention, with students who were immigrants and had very poor living conditions. Its techniques differed from those of most schools in Francoist Spain, more closely resembling ones from the Second Republic, and classes were taught in Catalan rather than Spanish. The endeavor got off to a difficult start, especially in regard to financing, but between 1972 and 1975 it had more than 400 students and was considered a model school. Canals was also the creator and member of various associations of teachers and professors, including the "Perímetre" teacher's group. She taught mathematics education at the Autonomous University of Barcelona and the Escola de Mestres de Vic.

She retired on 30 September 2001, but had continued to work in education. She was named a professor emeritus at the University of Girona, and remained active in its Gabinet de Materials i de Recerca per a la Matemàtica a l'Escola (GAMAR) research center.

== Canals Project ==
An undertaking of the Descartes Network, the Canals Project (Spanish: Proyecto Canals) attempts to digitize the large amount of educational materials created by María Antònia Canals. Emphasis is placed on the use of information and communications technology and how to integrate it with didactic tools.

== Publications ==
- La higiene psíquica del niño: resultado de una experiencia montessoriana (1981), with María Goudeli, Ediciones Hispano-Griegas, ISBN 9788485948000
- Viure les matemàtiques de 3 a 6 anys (2000), Associació de Mestres Rosa Sensat, ISBN 9788489149748
- "Material manipulativo y aprendizaje de las matemáticas en la escuela primaria" (2001) in Maestros, Vol. 7, no. 17, pp. 41–44
- Vivir las matemáticas (2001), Octaedro, ISBN 9788480634977
- Coversaciones matemáticas con Maria Antònia Canals o Cómo hacer de las matemáticas un aprendizaje apasionante (2008), with Puri Biniés, Editorial Graó, ISBN 9788478176526
- Documents de treball de Maria Antònia Canals (2009), with Tomàs Queralt and Onofre Monzó del Olmo, València Federació Espanyola de Societats de Professors de Matemàtiques, ISBN 9788461340897
- Proyecto Canals: recursos interactivos de matemáticas (2011), ITE D.L., ISBN 9788436951738

=== GAMAR series published by the Associació de Mestres Rosa Sensat ===
- Estadística, combinatòria i probabilitat (2009), ISBN 9788492748075 / Estadística, combinatoria y problemas (2009), ISBN 9788492748082
- Fraccions (2009), ISBN 9788492748051 / Fracciones (2009), ISBN 9788492748068
- Lògica a totes les edats (2009), ISBN 9788492748099 / Lógica a todas las edades (2009), ISBN 9788492748105
- Primers nombres i primeres operacions (2009), ISBN 9788492748037 / Primeros números y primeras operaciones (2009), ISBN 9788492748044
- Superfícies, volums i línies (2009), ISBN 9788492748112 / Superficies, volúmenes y líneas (2009), ISBN 9788492748112
- Transformacions geomètriques (2009), ISBN 9788492748136 / Transformaciones geométricas (2009), ISBN 9788492748143
- Problemes i més problemes (2010), ISBN 9788492748198 / Problemas y más problemas (2010), ISBN 9788492748204
- Els Reglets (2010), ISBN 9788492748334 / Las regletas (2011), ISBN 9788492748402
- Matemàtiques. Quadern 1 (2011), ISBN 9788492748471 / Matemáticas. Cuaderno 1 (2011), ISBN 9788492748426
- Matemàtiques. Quadern 2 (2011), ISBN 9788492748488 / Matemáticas. Cuaderno 2 (2011), ISBN 9788492748433
- Matemàtiques. Quadern 3 (2011), ISBN 9788492748495 / Matemáticas. Cuaderno 3 (2011), ISBN 9788492748440
- Matemàtiques. Quadern 4 (2011), ISBN 9788492748549 / Matemáticas. Cuaderno 4 (2011), ISBN 9788492748518
- Matemàtiques. Quadern 5 (2011), ISBN 9788492748556 / Matemáticas. Cuaderno 5 (2011), ISBN 9788492748525
- Matemàtiques. Quadern 6 (2011), ISBN 9788492748563 / Matemáticas. Cuaderno 6 (2011), ISBN 9788492748525
- Matemàtiques. Quadern 7 (2012), ISBN 9788492748679 / Matemáticas. Cuaderno 7 (2011), ISBN 9788492748600
- Matemàtiques. Quadern 8 (2012), ISBN 9788492748686 / Matemáticas. Cuaderno 8 (2012), ISBN 9788492748617
- Matemàtiques. Quadern 9 (2012), ISBN 9788492748693 / Matemáticas. Cuaderno 9 (2012), ISBN 9788492748624
- Matemàtiques. Quadern 10 (2012), ISBN 9788492748709 / Matemáticas. Cuaderno 10 (2012), ISBN 9788492748648
- Matemàtiques. Quadern 11 (2012), ISBN 9788492748716 / Matemáticas. Cuaderno 11 (2012), ISBN 9788492748655
- Matemàtiques. Quadern 12 (2012), ISBN 9788492748723 / Matemáticas. Cuaderno 12 (2012), ISBN 9788492748662
- Matemàtiques. Quadern 13 (2013), ISBN 9788492748914 / Matemáticas. Cuaderno 13 (2013), ISBN 9788492748945
- Matemàtiques. Quadern 14 (2013), ISBN 9788492748921 / Matemáticas. Cuaderno 14 (2013), ISBN 9788492748952
- Matemàtiques. Quadern 15 (2013), ISBN 9788492748938 / Matemáticas. Cuaderno 15 (2013), ISBN 9788492748969
- Nombres i operacions II (2013), ISBN 9788494148200 / Números y operaciones II (2013), ISBN 9788494148248
- Mesures i geometria (2016), ISBN 9788494381362 / Medidas y geometría (2016), ISBN 9788499218410

== Recognitions ==
- Medal of Merit at Work (1986)
- Mestres 68 Award (1994)
- Gold Insignia of the University of Vic (2000)
- Creu de Sant Jordi (2006)
- Gonzalo Sánchez Vázquez Award (2007)
- Medal of Honor of Barcelona (2009)
- Member of the Naukas Periodic Table of Scientists (2019)
