= Sinarades =

Sinarades Σιναράδες
- Community
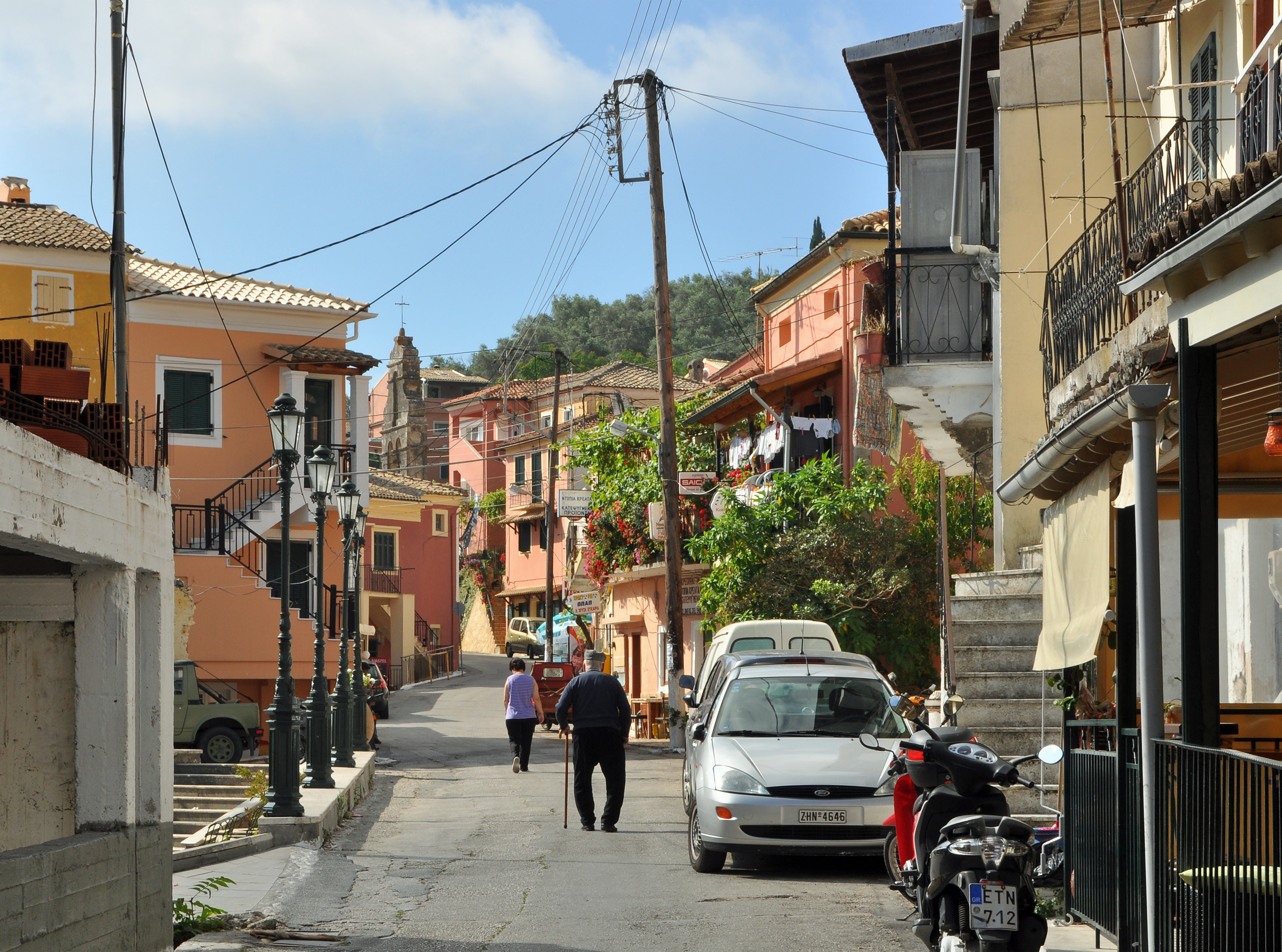
- Sinarades: main street

- Location within Greece
- Coordinates: 39°34′N 19°51′E
- Country: Greece
- Administrative region: Ionian Islands
- Regional unit: Corfu
- Municipality: Central Corfu and Diapontia Islands
- Municipal unit: Parelioi

Population (2021)
  - Community: 722
- Time zone: UTC+2 (EET)
  - Summer (DST): UTC+3 (EEST)
- Vehicle registration: ΚΥ

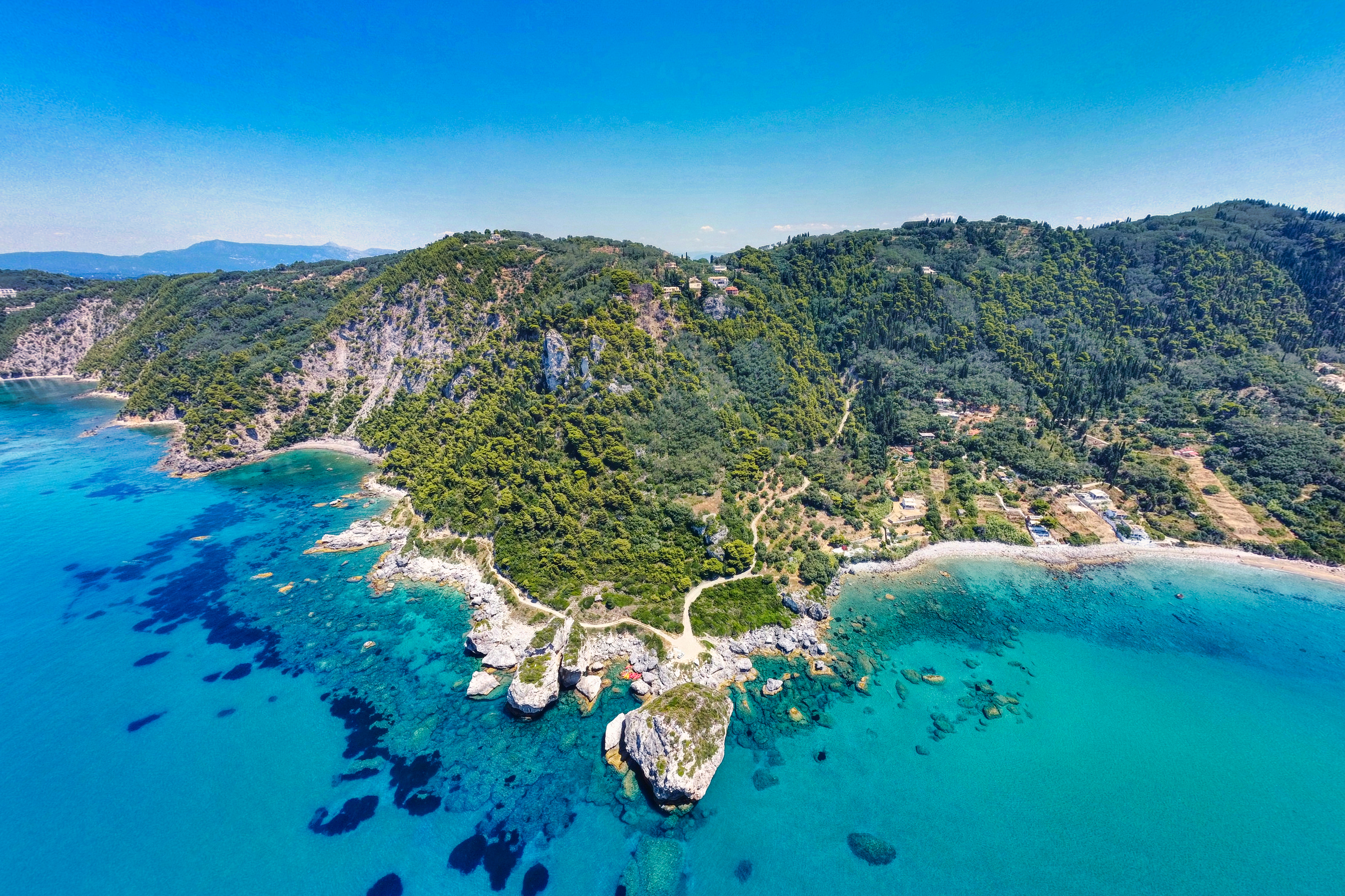
Agios Gordios Viewpoint and above it "Αερόστατο" (the "balloon" viewpoint) and Aspes

Sinarades (Greek: Σιναράδες) is a town and a community in the northern part of the island of Corfu, Greece, part of the municipal unit of Parelioi. The community includes the small villages Aspes and Kontogialos. Sinarades is the largest village of Parelioi. Sinarades is located southwest of the city of Corfu.

== Population ==
Year	Town population	Community population
1981	1,019	-
1991	1,062	-
2001	1,124	1,218
2011	854	920
2021	646	722

== See also ==
- List of settlements in the Corfu regional unit
