= Jordi =

Jordi (Catalan pronunciation: ['ʒɔɾ.di]) is the Catalan form of the ancient Greek name Georgios. Jordi is a popular name in Catalonia and is also given in the Netherlands and in Spanish-, English- and German-speaking countries.

Jordi may also refer to:

Sant Jordi – patron saint of Catalonia and Aragon

Diada de Sant Jordi – "Saint George's Day", Catalan holiday held on April 23 with similarities to Valentine's Day, traditionally men give women roses and women give men a book to celebrate the occasion.

== People ==
=== Academics and business ===
- Jordi Canals – economist and former business school dean
- Jordi Galí – macroeconomist, professor, and author
- Jordi Montana – industrial design expert and Rector of the University of Vic
- Jordi Nadal – economist and historian
- Jordi Ustrell Aguilà – computer engineer and pioneer of Internet banking

=== Activism ===
- Jordi Casamitjana

=== Art and media ===
- Jordi (Israeli musician)
- Jordi Bernet – Spanish comics artist who used Jordi as a pseudonym in the 60s and 70s
- Jordi Bonet – Spanish-born Canadian painter, ceramist, muralist, and sculptor
- Jordi Caballero – movie and television actor, dancer, choreographer and producer
- Jordi Davieson – lead vocals and guitar for Australian four-piece indie pop band San Cisco
- Jordi Galceran – Spanish playwright and author
- Jordi James – lead singer of the British band Sugarthief
- Jordi Mollà – Spanish-born actor, filmmaker, writer, and artist
- Jordi Morgan – radio and television broadcaster in Nova Scotia, Canada
- Jordi El Niño Polla (born 1994), Spanish pornographic actor
- Jordi Palacios, fictional character in Red Band Society (TV series)
- Jordi Roca – pastry chef of the restaurant El Celler de Can Roca
- Jordi Savall – Spanish violist
- Jordi Vilasuso – Cuban-American actor
- Jordi Webber – member of New Zealand band Titanium

=== Military and politics ===
- Jordi Cuixart – president of Òmnium Cultural, which preserves and promotes Catalan culture
- Jordi Darmstadt – Prince George Louis of Hessen-Darmstadt, Field Marshal in the Austrian army
- Jordi Farragut – United States Navy officer during the American Revolutionary War
- Jordi Font Mariné (born 1955), Andorran politician
- Jordi Hereu – former mayor of Barcelona
- Jordi Pujol – former president of Catalonia
- Jordi Salvador (born 1964), Spanish Catalan politician
- Jordi Sànchez i Picanyol – president of the Catalan National Assembly, an organization promoting Catalan independence

=== Sport ===
- Jordi Aláez – Andorran footballer
- Jordi Alba – Spanish football player for Inter Miami and the Spain national football team
- Jordi Aluja – Spanish football coach
- Jordi Amat (footballer) – Indonesian footballer
- Jordi Bitter – Dutch footballer
- Jordi Codina – professional footballer who plays for Getafe CF as a goalkeeper
- Jordi Cruyff – Dutch football player and son of Johan Cruyff
- Jordi Fernández - Spanish basketball coach
- Jordi Gómez – Spanish professional footballer who plays for Sunderland
- Jordi Figueras Montel – Spanish footballer commonly known as Jordi
- Jordi Hoogstrate – retired Dutch footballer
- Jordi Masip – goalkeeper for Real Valladolid
- Jordi Murphy – Barcelona-born Irish rugby player
- Jordi Pasqualin – English rugby player
- Jordi Puig – Spanish basketball player
- Jordi Roura – Spanish former football player and current FC Barcelona academy
- Jordi Tarrés (footballer) (born 1981), Spanish and Hong Kong footballer
- Jordi Tarrés (motorcycle trials rider) - Spanish trials rider
- Jordi Tur (born 1998), Spanish professional footballer
- Jordi Valadon – Australian professional footballer
- Jordi van Gelderen – Dutch professional footballer
- Jordi Vanlerberghe – Belgian professional footballer
- Jordi Xumetra – professional footballer who plays for Real Zaragoza

== In popular culture ==
- Jordi (album), a 2021 album by Maroon 5
- Jordi Palacios – character played by Nolan Sotillo on FOX comedy-drama Red Band Society
- Jordi's Star – children's book by author Alma Flor Ada
- Palau Sant Jordi – the main indoor sporting arena in Barcelona, Spain

== See also ==
- Jordy, given name
- Geordi, given name
- Geordie, given name
- Yordi, given name
