= Geordie Neave =

English footballer

Personal information
- Position: Centre half

Senior career*
Years	Team	Apps	(Gls)
1895–1896	Lincoln City	29	(0)
–	Dundee		
- * Club domestic league appearances and goals

George D. "Geordie" Neave (fl. 1895–96) was a footballer who made 29 appearances in the Football League playing for Lincoln City as a centre half. He was also on the books of Dundee.
