= Geordi Peats =

Australian rugby league footballer

Personal information
- Born: 11 April 1969 (age 57) Sydney, New South Wales, Australia

Playing information
- Height: 178 cm (5 ft 10 in)
- Weight: 85 kg (13 st 5 lb)
- Position: Hooker
Club
Years	Team	Pld	T	G	FG	P
1989–94	Canterbury Bulldogs	54	4	0	0	16
1996–98	South Sydney	20	5	0	0	20
	Total	74	9	0	0	36
- Relatives: Nathan Peats (son)

Geordi Peats (born 11 April 1969) is an Australian former professional rugby league footballer who played in the 1980s and 1990s. He played for the Canterbury-Bankstown Bulldogs and South Sydney. He primarily played at hooker. He is the father of Nathan Peats.

== Playing career ==
Peats joined the Canterbury-Bankstown Bulldogs in 1989. He made his first grade debut in round 11 of the 1989 season for Canterbury at hooker in their 16–2 win against the Parramatta Eels at Belmore Sports Ground.

Peats also captained the Under 21 side in his first season at the Bulldogs. In 1990, Peats became a regular member of the reserve grade team, and in 1991, he became a regular member of the first grade team. In round 1 of the 1991 season, Peats won the man of the match award in the Bulldogs' 26–16 win over the Balmain Tigers at Leichhardt Oval. Peats scored his first try in first grade in the Bulldogs' 18–16 loss to the Canberra Raiders at Bruce Stadium in round 9 of the 1991 season. After spending most of the next three seasons back in reserve grade, his stint at Canterbury ended at the conclusion of the 1994 season.

Peats had signed for the St. George Dragons for the 1995 season, but after suffering numerous injuries in the pre season, he would miss the entire regular season, and consequently left St. George at season's end without playing a single game for them. In 1996, Peats joined the South Sydney Rabbitohs. After three injury plagued seasons at Souths, including not playing a single game in the 1997 season, he decided to retire at the conclusion of the 1998 season.
