= University of Vic - Central University of Catalonia =

Coordinates: 41.9338°N 2.2472°E

University of Vic - Central University of Catalonia (UVic-UCC)
- Universitat de Vic - Universitat Central de Catalunya
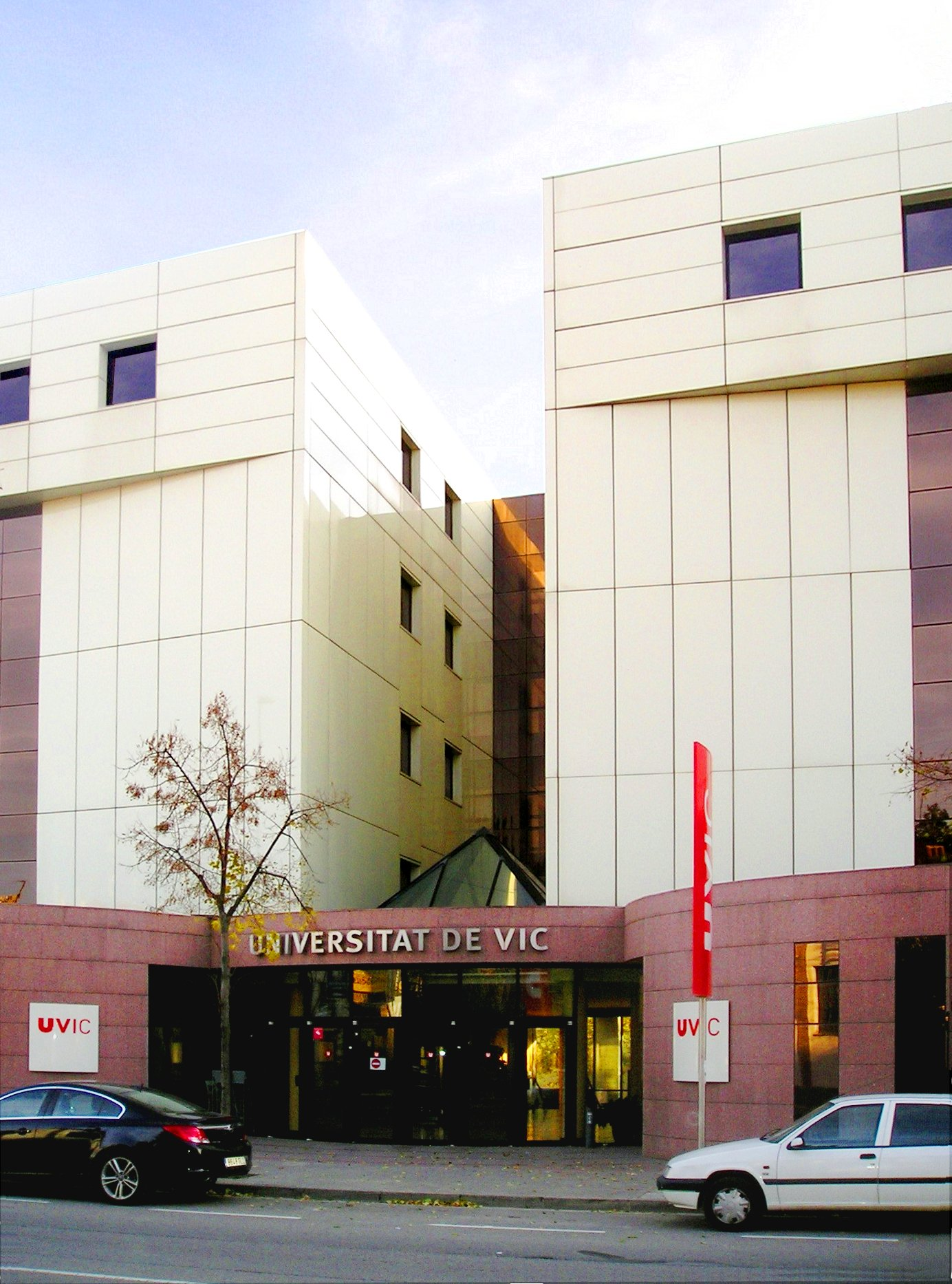
- Motto: Scientiae patriaeque impendere vitam (Latin)
- Type: Privately managed under public supervision
- Established: 1599 as Literary University of Vic, 1997 re-foundation of the current University
- Affiliations: Xarxa Vives d'Universitats
- Rector: Marta Otero Viñas
- Academic staff: 863
- Administrative staff: 243
- Students: 15,335
- Location: Spain
- Campus: Vic, Manresa and Barcelona
- Website: https://uvic-ucc.cat/
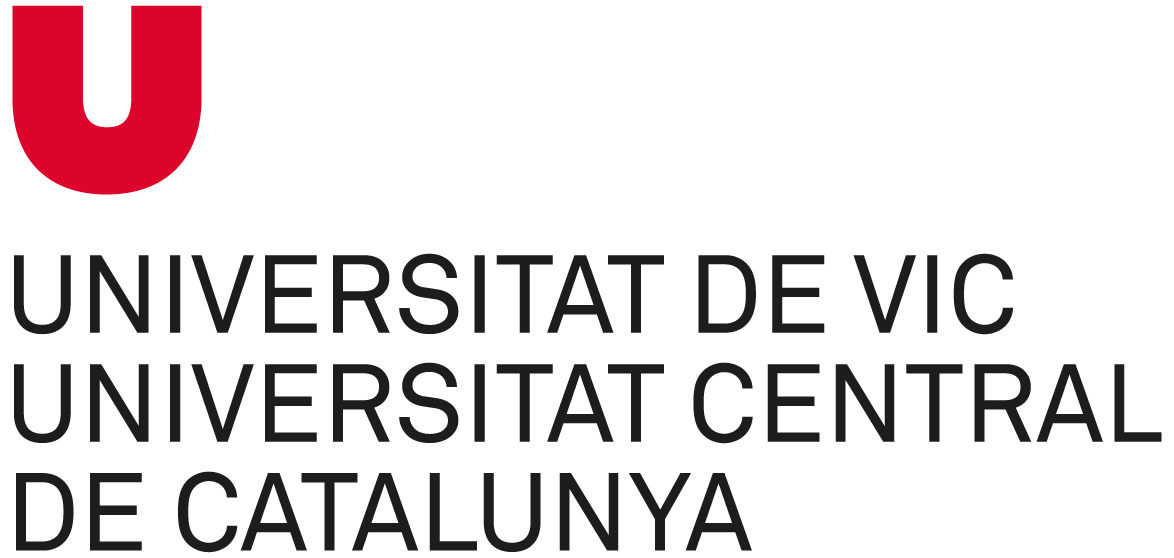

The University of Vic - Central University of Catalonia (UVic-UCC) is a Catalan university with premises in Vic, Manresa and Granollers. It is a privately managed institution, under public supervision through its proprietor, the Balmes University Foundation, whose chair is the Mayor of Vic. UVic-UCC is a higher education and research centre. The UVic-UCC is a member of the Vives University Network.

It was recognised as a university in 1997, the result of the fusion of several centres in Vic affiliated to other universities. Initially, there was a campus only in Vic, but in 2014 the University of Vic was reconstituted as the University of Vic - Central University of Catalonia (UVic-UCC), as a result of the federation between the University of Vic and university centres in Manresa managed by the Bages University Foundation.

The emblem of the University of Vic is the A of Charlemagne, a Carolingian gold ornament symbolising the principles of learning and boundless expansion. The university lemma, Scientiae patriaeque impendere vitam, is a verse of Lucan that means "Devoting life to the service of science and the community".

== History ==
The modern-day University of Vic has various historical antecedents. In 1599, Philip III of Spain granted Vic´s General Study the right to award degrees in Art and Philosophy, founding the Literary University of Vic. In 1717, after the War of the Spanish Succession, Philip V suppressed all the Catalan universities, and founded the University of Cervera in their place. In 1749, the Vic Seminary for training priests was founded. In the 19th century Vic became a hub of cultural activity in the Catalan Revival, with figures of renown such as Jaume Balmes, Jacint Verdaguer and Jaume Collell, and institutions like the Episcopalian Library and Archive and the Literary Circle.

In 1873, the city council tried without success to re-establish the University of Vic. Finally during the Transition, the Jaume Balmes Teacher Training School, affiliated with the University of Barcelona, was founded in 1977. The publishing house Eumo Editorial (EUMO is the Catalan acronym for University School of Teachers of Osona) was created in 1979 and the design studio Eumogràfic in 1984. The 1987–1988 academic year was the first of the Estudis Universitaris de Vic with three teaching centres: the Jaume Balmes Teacher Training School, the University School of Business Studies of Osona, affiliated with the University of Barcelona, and the Osona Nursing School, affiliated with the Autonomous University of Barcelona.

The Polytechnic School opened in 1989, followed by the Faculty of Translation and Interpreting in 1993. In 1997, this group of centres merged into a new university, offically recognised by the Parliament of Catalonia.

== Rectors ==
Rector	Mandate
Ricard Torrents i Bertrana	1997 – 2002
David Serrat i Congost	2002 – 2006
Assumpta Fargas i Riera	2006 – 2010
Jordi Montaña i Matosas	2010 – 2018
Joan Masnou Suriñach	July 2018 – Jan 2019
Josep Eladi Baños	2019 – 2026
Marta Otero Viñas	2026 - present

== Notable alumni ==
- Segimon Serrallonga i Morer (1930–2002), philologist, poet and translator
- Joaquim Maideu i Puig (1932–1996), pedagogue and composer
- M. Antònia Canals i Tolosa (born 1930), teacher and mathematician
