= Jordi Montaña =

Jordi Montaña i Matosas has been the Rector of the University of Vic since 13 July 2010, when he was appointed by the Balmes University Foundation Board of Trustees.

== Teaching work ==
A full professor at Ramon Llull University and a lecturer at ESADE Business School in Barcelona, Jordi Montaña holds a doctorate in industrial engineering from the Polytechnic University of Catalonia, a master's degree in Business Administration and Management from ESADE and a degree in industrial engineering from the School of Industrial Engineering of Barcelona. He took postgraduate studies at the University of Bradford, at the Management Centre in Brussels and the International Institute for Management Development in Lausanne.

From 1976 until his appointment as Rector of the University of Vic, he was a lecturer at ESADE, where he was head of the ESADE Design Management Chair, undertaking research into design and business, and their impact on the economy and society.

At the same time, he was a visiting lecturer at the École des Hautes Études Commerciales, the University of Manchester Institute of Science and Technology, the WHU – Otto Beisheim School of Management in Koblenz, the Art Center College of Design (Switzerland), the Copenhagen Business School and the Bocconi University in Milan. He has taught at the Universidad Centroamericana in Managua, at the Central American University in San Salvador, at the EAFIT University in Medellin and at the Indian Institutes of Management. He was the first director of the DEADE programme in Cuba, a joint programme of ESADE, the London School of Economics and the École des Hautes Études Commerciales.

== Professional career ==
He has always been associated with the world of industrial design, and was the founder and chief executive officer of Quod, Disseny i Marketing SA and Enginyeria Cultural SA; the founder and chief executive officer of the National Society for the Development of Design and Innovation (Spanish Ministry of Industry and Energy); and president of the board of Integral Design and Development SA; president of the ADI-FAD, and trustee and executive committee member of the Barcelona Design Centre Foundation. He was a member of the board and treasurer for the international NGO Design for the World.

During his career, he has taught extensively, while at the same time providing consultancy in strategies for marketing, innovation, product development, design management and corporate branding for companies (Manpower, Sony, La Española, Novartis, Nestlé, Samsung, Hewlett-Packard, Lexmark and others) and institutions, including the Spanish Institute for Small and Medium Enterprises (Ministry of Industry), the Ministry of Industry of Nicaragua, the Venezuelan Ministry of Public Works, the United Nations Industrial Development Organization, the Inter-American Development Bank and the European Commission. He was a member of the group of design experts at the Office for Harmonization in the Internal Market, the European Union's office for the registration of European designs and trademarks.

== Awards ==
- 2010. The 'Marketing Trends Award' for his contribution to research in design, innovation and marketing, at the 9th ESCP Europe International Congress on Marketing Trends
- 2010. Gold Award from the North American Case Research Association.
