= Jordy van Loon =

Dutch child singer (born 1993)

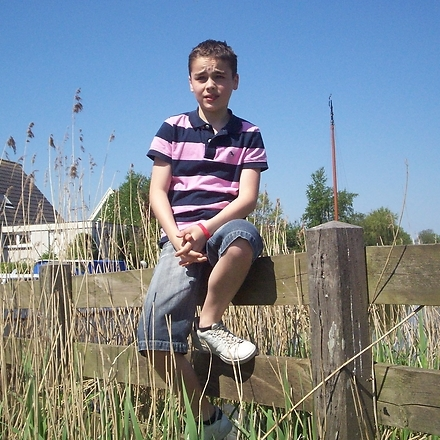
- Photograph by Bart Klaucke

Background information
- Also known as: Jordy de Lefty
- Born: Jordy van Loon; 16 June 1993 (age 33); Voorburg, Netherlands
- Occupations: Singer
- Instruments: Vocals
- Years active: 2008 – present
- Label: JAZ Music
- Website: www.jordyvanloon.com

Jordy van Loon (born 16 June 1993) is a Dutch child singer who reached number one in the Dutch Single Top 100 with his single "Verliefdheid".

== Personal life ==
Jordy van Loon, who has ADHD, is the middle son of Daniëlle and Dennis van Loon. Jordy was born in Voorburg and lives in Zoetermeer. He has two older brothers and two younger sisters. In 2006, his aunt entered him in a local radio contest in which he had to send in an original answering machine message for the phone of his idol Frans Bauer. He won the competition and got to sing Bauer's song "Hé lekker ding" together with Bauer during a meet and greet.

== Career ==
In an episode of Paul de Leeuw's television show Mooi! Weer de Leeuw, broadcast on 5 April 2008, van Loon was in the audience with his teacher Mr. Rol. Unbeknownst to him, Rol had sent in a wish to the program. He wanted to literally execute the Dutch idiom "iemand achter het behang plakken" (commonly used to describe an action one would like to perform on an annoying individual) and paste Jordy behind a piece of wallpaper because he sang too often in class. While being glued behind the wallpaper, he performed the Wim Sonneveld song "Het Dorp" (in English: the village), which received loud applause from the audience and resulted in six different companies calling in to offer him a record deal; he decided to sign with producer Jan Zwarteveen from JAZ Music who watched the show from the South of France.

van Loon's single was originally supposed to be released in August, but because producer JAZ Music was not satisfied with the result of "Zomer in Nederland", everything had to be redone.

In 2008, 3FM DJs Giel Beelen, Coen Swijnenberg and Paul Rabbering spent a week in a glass house in Breda without eating for their Serious Request. They chose "Verliefdheid" as that year's anthem. It became the most requested song and raised €1 million for the Red Cross. van Loon performed live when the DJs exited the house. DJ Armin van Buuren made his own mix of "Verliefdheid" during his stay in the Glass House.

On 17 January 2009, van Loon's single reached number one in the Single Top 100, beating Marco Borsato's single "Dochters" which dropped to the third position. The single held the top spot for one week and was in the charts for 19 weeks.

== Discography ==
=== Albums ===
Title	Album details	NL	Sales
Een Kusje Voor Jou	Release date: 1 October 2008; Label: JAZ Music	—	—

=== Singles ===
Year	Title	NL
2008	"Verliefdheid"	1
2009	"Een kusje voor jou"	13
2010	"Ik ben Jordy van Loon"	43
2011	"Het spel van Cupido"	41
