= Jordi Ustrell Aguilà =

Spanish computer engineer (born 1955)

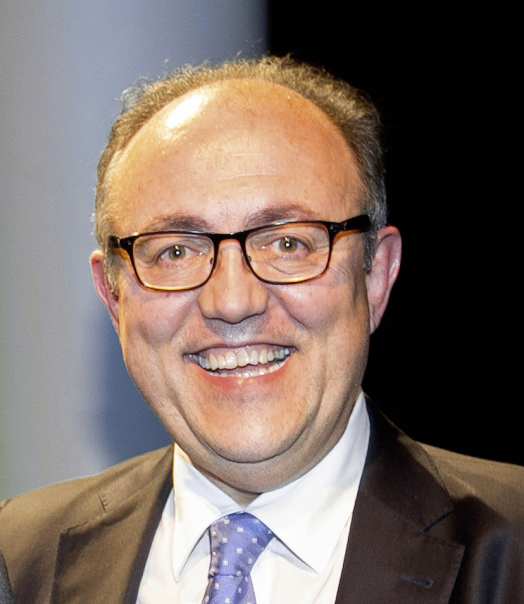
- Aguilà in 2014
- Born: August 3, 1955 (age 70); Barcelona, Spain
- Occupation: Computer engineer

Jordi Ustrell Aguilà (August 3, 1955) is a Spanish computer engineer and entrepreneur. He is recognized for his involvement in the development and implementation of foundational technologies in the history of computing and digital banking in Spain, including the design of what is considered the first Spanish personal microcomputer and the launch of the country's first fully operational internet banking services.

== Professional Career ==
=== Microcomputing and Hardware Development ===
In the late 1970s, Ustrell served as president and technical director of the company Eina Informàtica. In 1979, he designed a system that has been referenced by specialized publications as the first personal microcomputer developed in Spain.

=== Information Systems on CD-ROM ===
In the 1980s, he was the technical director of ComCal S.A., a company created to adapt major reference works and documentary databases to the CD-ROM format. The company developed the LST software, a solution for processing the SGML format and enabling the consultation of large data volumes via microcomputers, like the Diccionario de Medicina Marín (Marin Dictionary of Medicine) and the Vademecum: Especialidades Farmacéuticas (Vademecum: Pharmaceutical Specialties) both publications, presented at the Liber Fair in 1987, were pioneers in the use of CD-ROM in Spanish for large-scale reference works.

=== Implementation of Digital Banking ===
Subsequently, Ustrell served as Director of Technological Innovation at Banco Sabadell. From this position, he led the introduction of Internet technology within the entity in the early 1990s. This included establishing the initial infrastructure, setting up the first domains, developing the first corporate websites, and implementing email services.

In 1996, he achieved a significant milestone with the launch of the first fully operational internet banking services in Spain for both private and corporate clients.

=== E-Commerce and Mobility ===
His work extended to the development of new online transactional services, including:

- Secure Payment Systems: Participation in the implementation of the VISA SET, payment system in Spain and the development of digital signature systems and payment gateways.
- Early Mobile Banking: Implementation of a WAP channel for banking transactions via mobile phone.
- New Banking Models: Creation of a bank operating entirely over the internet (ActivoBank).
- Certification Infrastructure: Participation in global (Identrus) and national (Iberion) banking consortia to establish certification infrastructures for secure electronic commerce.

His trajectory in adapting and promoting these technologies in Spain has earned him recognition as one of the pioneers of the Internet in Catalonia. as reported in Sobirania.cat.
