= Geordie (disambiguation) =

A Geordie is a demonym and vernacular dialect characterising Newcastle-upon-Tyne and the wider Tyneside area of North East England.

Geordie may also refer to:

== Arts and entertainment ==
- Geordie (ballad), a Child ballad, and the name of a character in it
- Geordie (band), a 1970s British glam rock band
- Geordie (film), a 1955 British film

== People ==
- Geordie (given name), a list of people with the given name or nickname

== Other uses ==
- Geordie, a nickname for Newcastle United F.C.
- HMT Geordie – see List of requisitioned trawlers of the Royal Navy (WWII)
