= Jordy =

Jordy is a gender neutral name, and sometimes a diminutive of the name Jordan. Notable people and characters with the name include:

== People ==
- Jordy (American singer) (Jordan Shulman), American singer-songwriter
- Jordy (French singer) (Jordy Lemoine, born 1988), French singer and musician
- Jordy Bahl (born 2002), American softball player
- Jordy Birch (fl. 1991–present), Canadian singer-songwriter and music producer
- Jordy ter Borgh (born 1994), Dutch footballer
- Jordy Brouwer (born 1988), Dutch footballer
- Jordy Buijs (born 1988), Dutch footballer
- Jordy Clasie (born 1991), Dutch footballer
- Jordy Croux (born 1994), Belgian footballer
- Jordy van Deelen (born 1993), Dutch footballer
- Jordy Delem (born 1993), footballer from Martinique
- Jordy Deckers (born 1989), Dutch footballer
- Jordy Douglas (born 1958), Canadian ice hockey player
- Jordy van Egmond (born 1992), Dutch EDM producer and DJ, better known as Dyro
- Jordy Gaspar (born 1997), French footballer
- Jordy Hiwula (born 1994), English footballer
- Jordy Lokando (born 1997), Belgian footballer
- Jordy van Loon (born 1993), Dutch singer
- Jordy Mercer (born 1986), American baseball player
- Jordy Mont-Reynaud (born 1983), American chess master
- Jordy Nelson (born 1985), American football player
- Jordy Reid (born 1991), Australian rugby union footballer
- Jordy Searcy (born 1994), singer-songwriter
- Jordy Smith (born 1988), South African surfer
- Jordy Thomassen (born 1993), Dutch footballer
- Jordy Todosey (born 1995), Canadian actress and singer under the stage name, Odditie.
- Jordy Vleugels (born 1996), Belgian footballer
- Jordy Walker (1930–2010), sailor from Bermuda in the 1972 Olympics
- Jordy de Wijs (born 1995), Dutch footballer
- Jordy van der Winden (born 1994), Dutch footballer
- Jordy Zuidam (born 1980), Dutch footballer
- Carlos Jordy (born 1982), Brazilian politician

== See also ==
- Jordi
- Jordie
- Geordie (given name)
- Geordi La Forge, a character in the television series Star Trek: The Next Generation
- Geordy, given name
