= Giannades =

Giannades Γιαννάδες
- Community
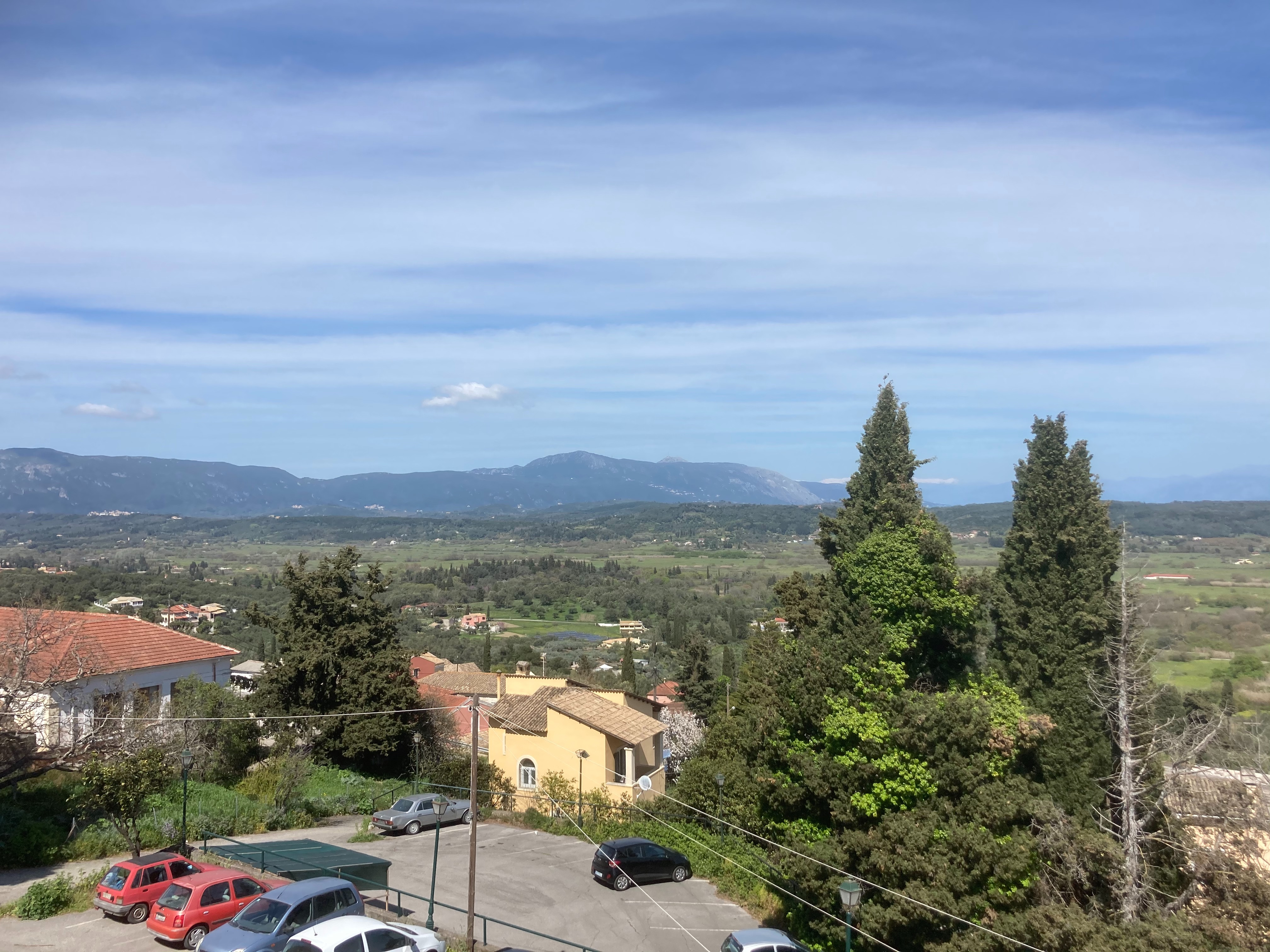
- Giannades

- Location within Greece
- Coordinates: 39°38′N 19°46′E
- Country: Greece
- Administrative region: Ionian Islands
- Regional unit: Corfu
- Municipality: Central Corfu and Diapontia Islands
- Municipal unit: Parelioi

Population (2021)
  - Community: 504
- Time zone: UTC+2 (EET)
  - Summer (DST): UTC+3 (EEST)
- Vehicle registration: ΚΥ

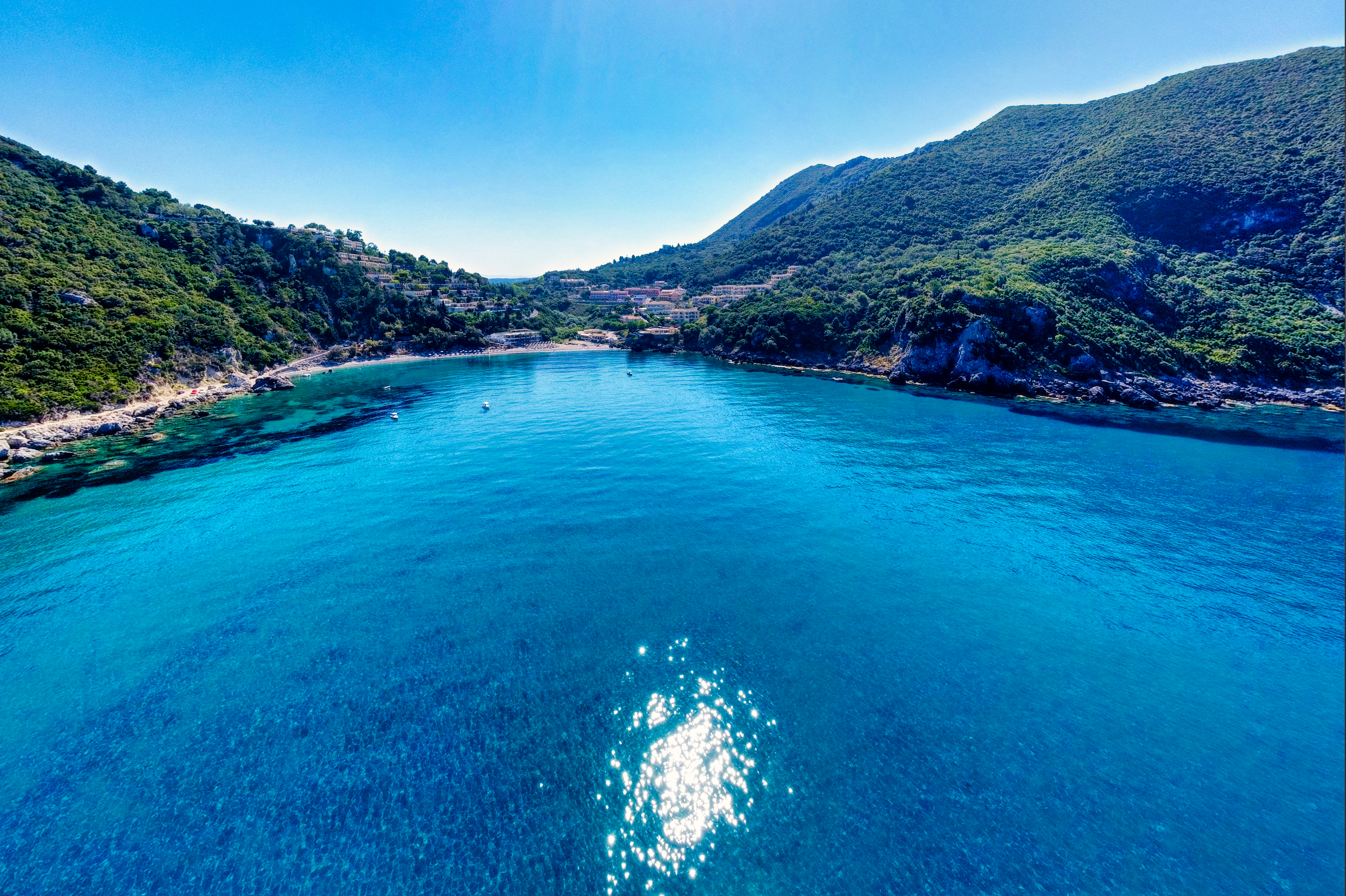
Ermones Beach, Giannades

Giannades (Greek: Γιαννάδες) is a village and a community in the northwestern part of the island of Corfu. It is located in the municipal unit of Parelioi. The community includes the village Ermones. Giannades is located 13 km west of the city of Corfu and 7 km southeast of Palaiokastritsa. Giannades is situated on a hillside, 1.5 km from the coast.

== Population ==
Year	Settlement population	Community population
1981	723	-
1991	776	-
2001	760	799
2011	565	597
2021	490	504

== See also ==
- List of settlements in the Corfu regional unit
