= Gordie Mitchell =

Canadian football player

Profile
- Positions: Tackle, Guard, Center

Personal information
- Born: c. 1933; Edmonton, Alberta, Canada
- Listed height: 6 ft 3 in (1.91 m)
- Listed weight: 235 lb (107 kg)

Career history
- 1955–1962: BC Lions

Gordon Mitchell (born c. 1933, date of death unknown) was a Canadian professional football player who played for the BC Lions. Mitchell is deceased.
