= Agios Gordios =

Human settlement in Greece

Coordinates: 39.547°N 19.853°E

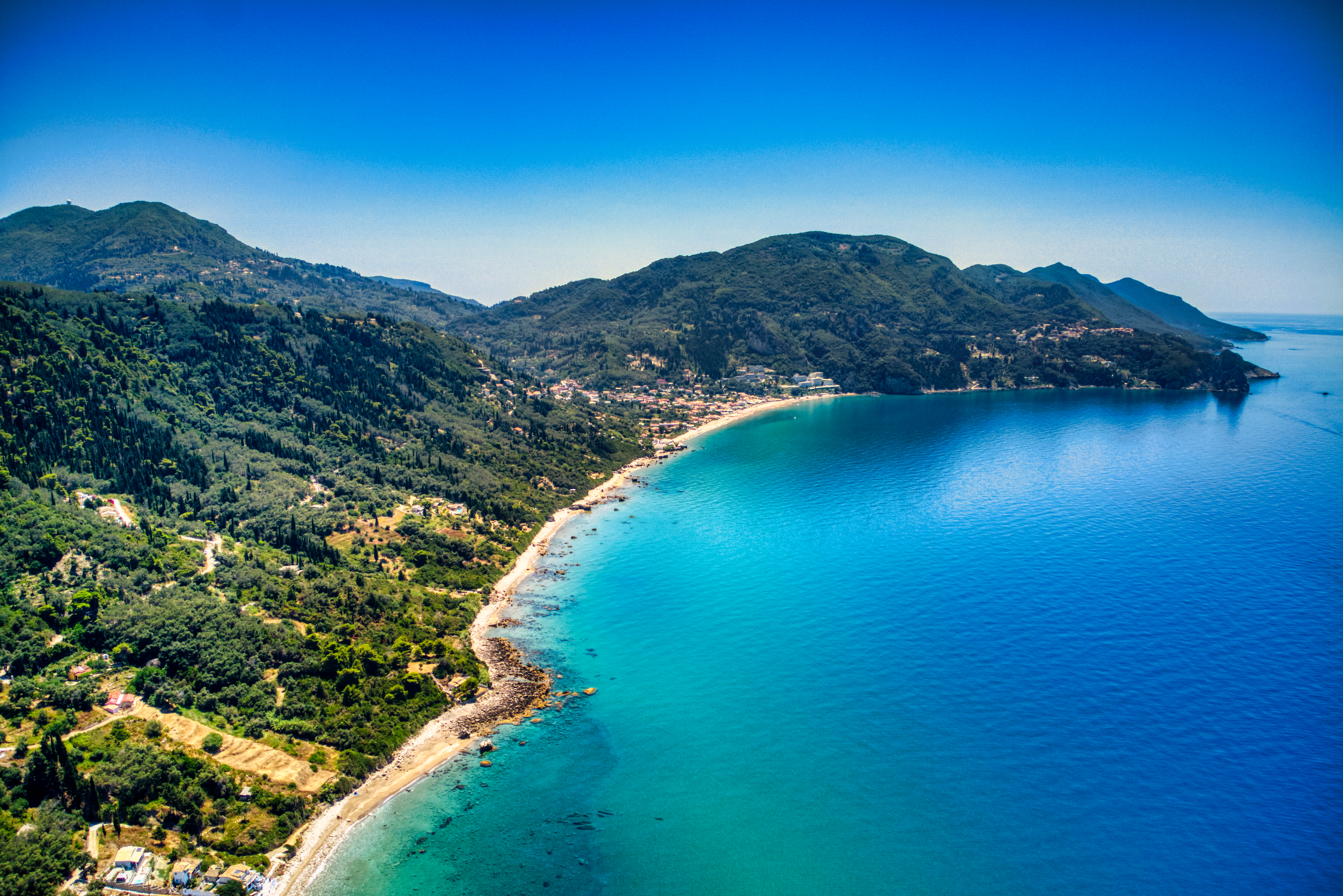
Bay of Agios Gordios

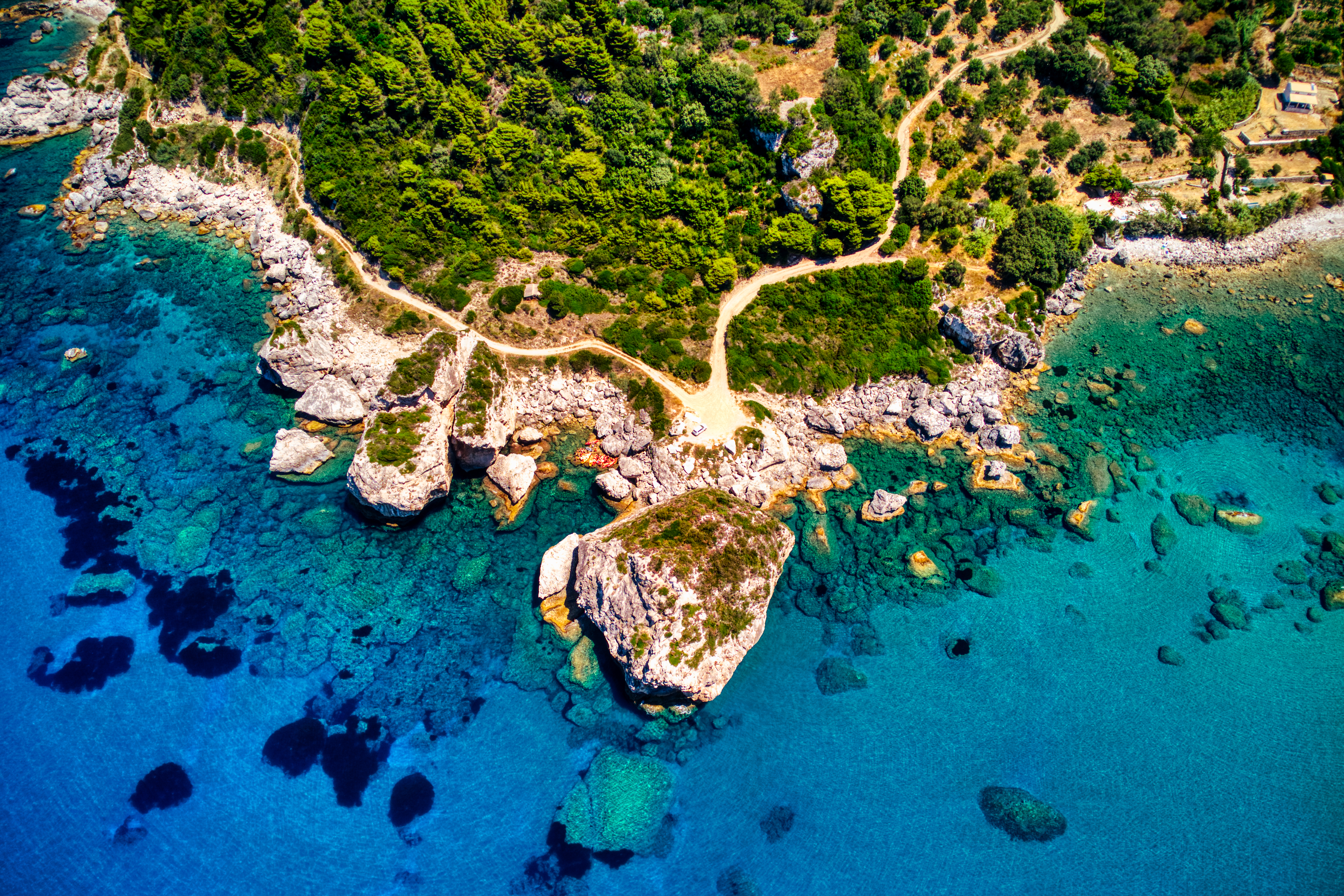
The sea near Agios Gordios

Agios Gordios (Greek: Άγιος Γόρδιος) known locally as Ai Gordis (Greek: Άη Γόρδης) is a coastal village on the west coast of the Greek island of Corfu. The beach is located downhill from Sinarades. It is home to several small hotels including The Pink Palace hotel and hostel, which was visited by Queen frontman Freddie Mercury in his youth.
