= Angelos Giallinas =

Greek painter

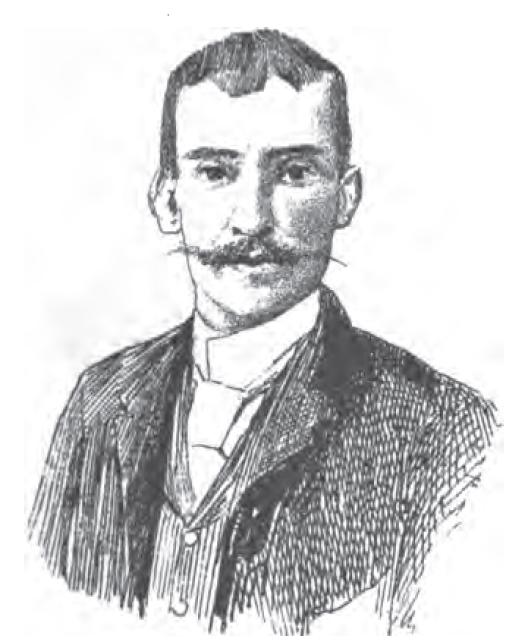
Angelos Giallinas (1893), from Εστία (Home) magazine.

Angelos Giallinas or Yallinas (Greek: Άγγελος Γιαλλινάς; 5 March 1857, Corfu, United States of the Ionian Islands - 1939, Corfu) was a Greek landscape painter, known primarily for his watercolors. He was one of the last representatives of the Heptanese School of art.

== Biography ==
Born in Corfu, Giallinas studied from 1872 to 1875 at the private art school of Charalambos Pachis. Later he continued his studies in Venice, Naples and Rome where he decided to devote himself to watercolors. He returned to Corfu in 1878.

He soon began participating in the "Panhellenic Exhibitions"" in Athens and presented his first solo exhibition in 1886. It was there that he met the British Ambassador, Clare Ford, who commissioned him to paint albums of landscapes from Venice, Spain, Rhodes and Istanbul. Ford also arranged an exhibit in London, which ran from 1891 to 1892, and introduced Giallinas to the British nobility.

He also participated in the Exposition Universelle (1900). Two years later, he started his own private art school on Corfu. From 1907 to 1908, he painted murals at the Achilleion, a palace built by Empress Elisabeth of Austria. His largest exhibition was organized in 1918 at the "Galerie D’Art Geo" in Athens. He died in 1939.

A major retrospective of his work was held at the National Gallery of Greece in 1974. Moreover, his home became an art gallery. In 2010, several paintings were stolen and have not been recovered. Giallinas paintings can be found at the National Gallery of Greece, the Municipal Gallery of Corfu, the Municipal Gallery of Larissa, the Teloglion Foundation of Arts etc.

== Gallery ==
The following images are watercolour paintings by Angelos Giallinas, printed in three colour lithography by Aspiotis, Greece.

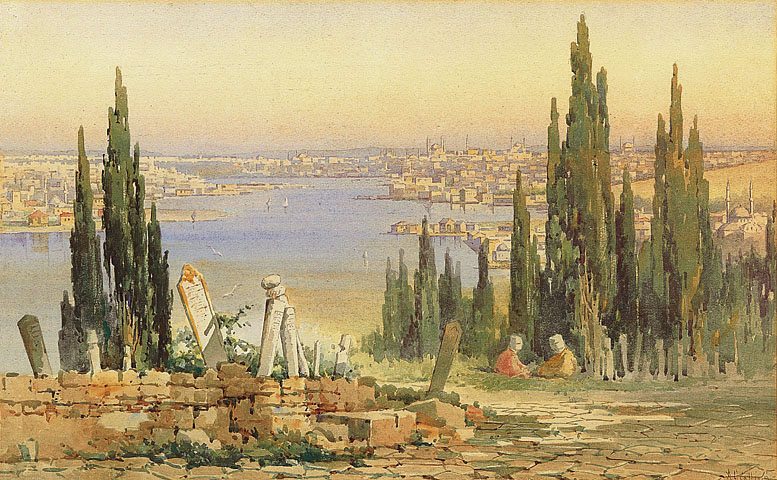
The Golden Horn (late 1880s)

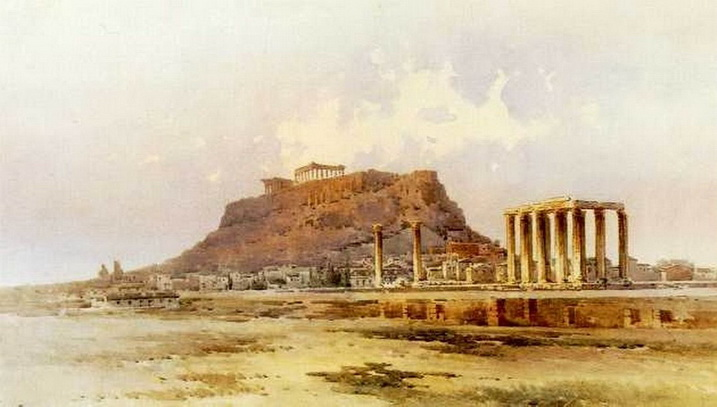
Temple of Olympian Zeus and Acropolis of Athens

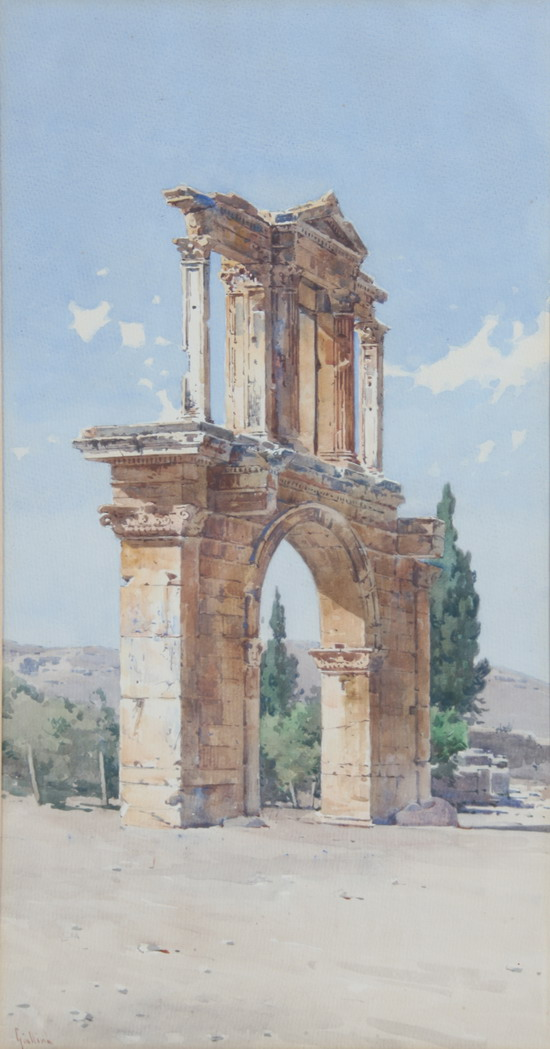
Arch of Hadrian

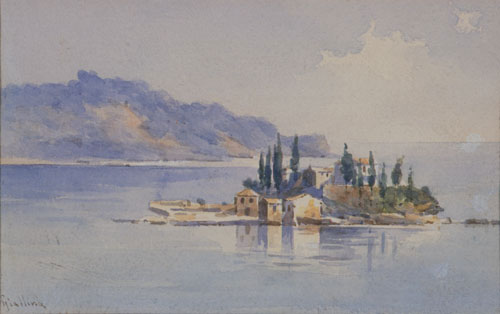
Pontikonisi

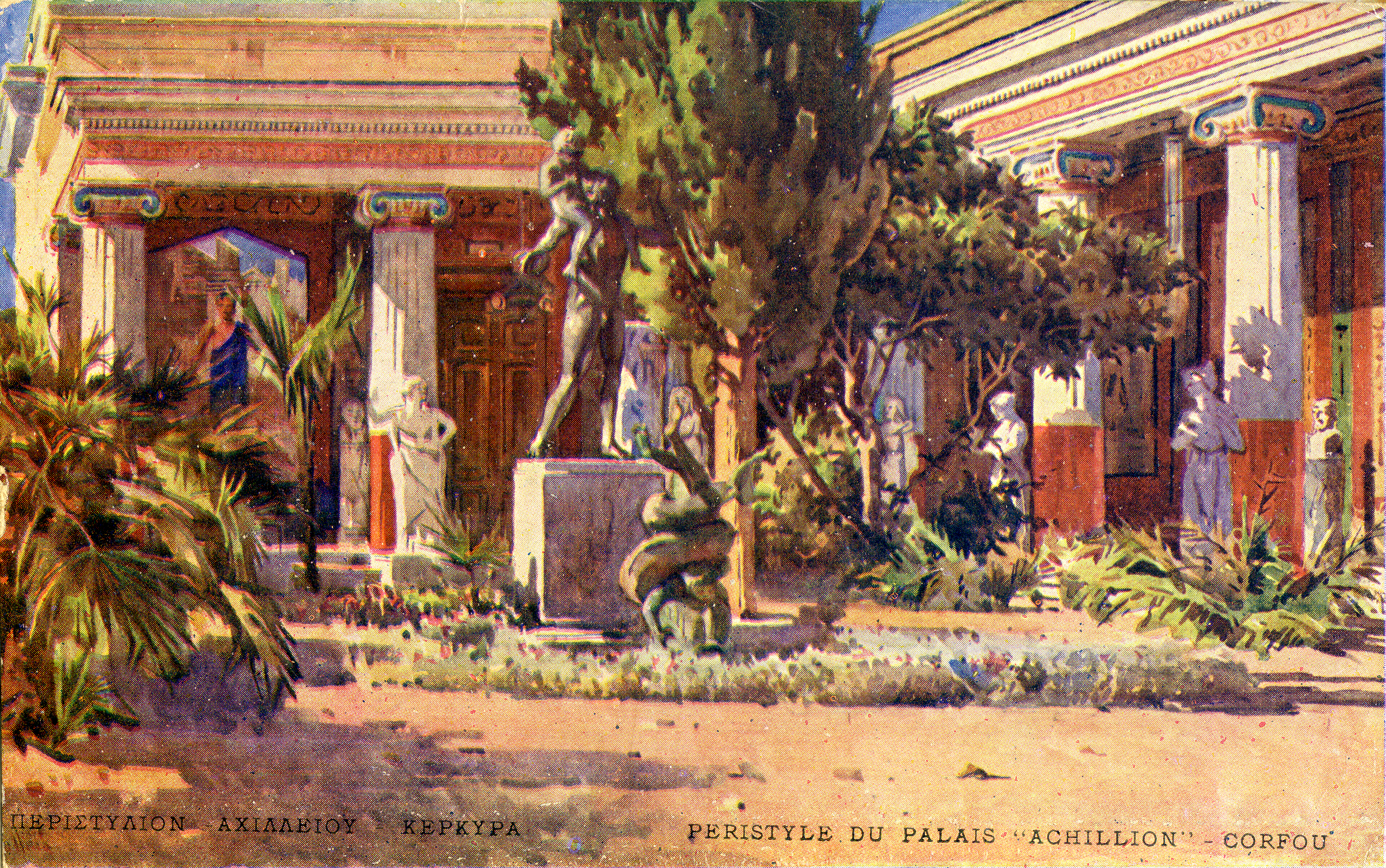
Aspiotis No. 100

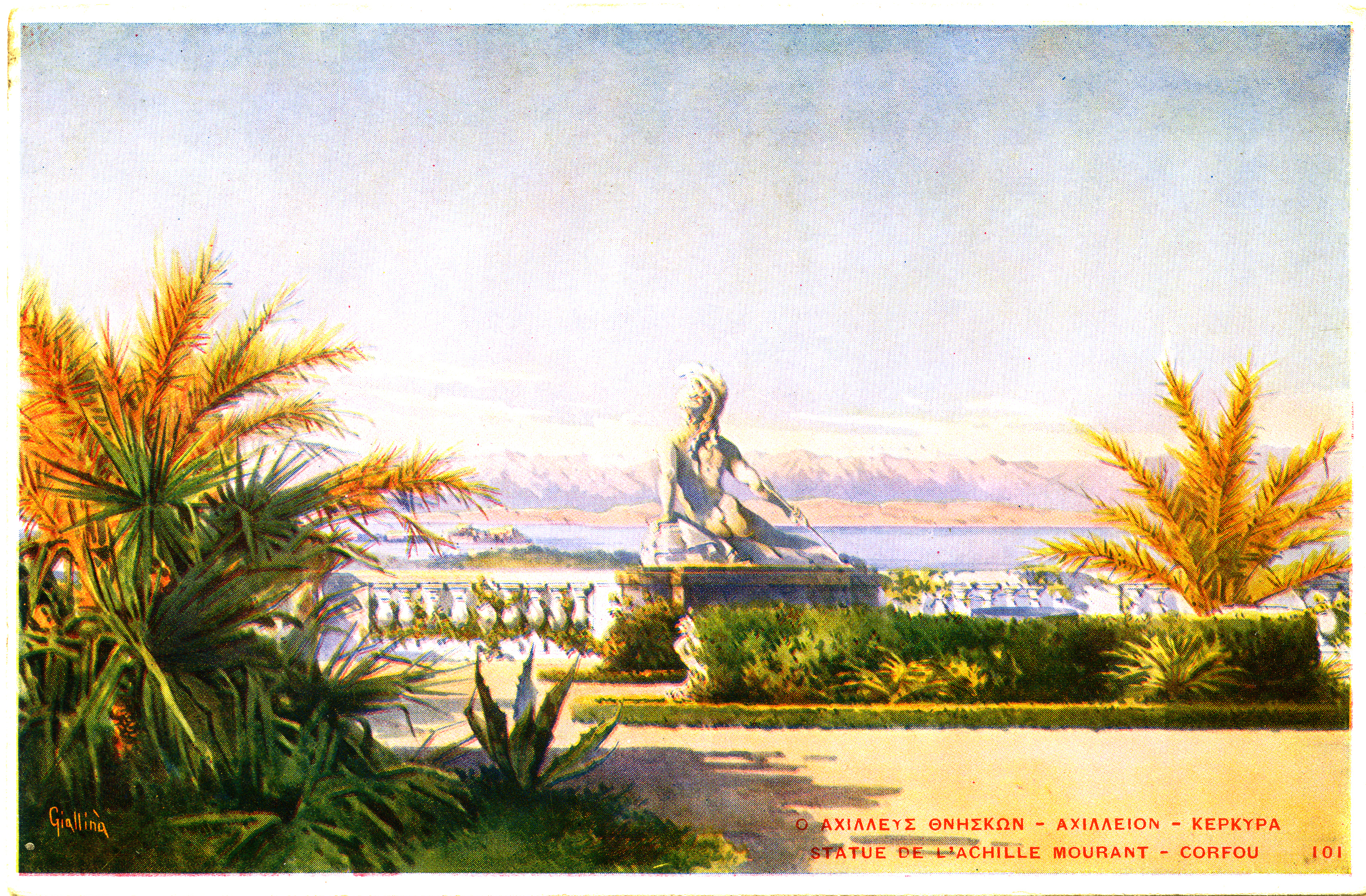
Aspiotis No. 101

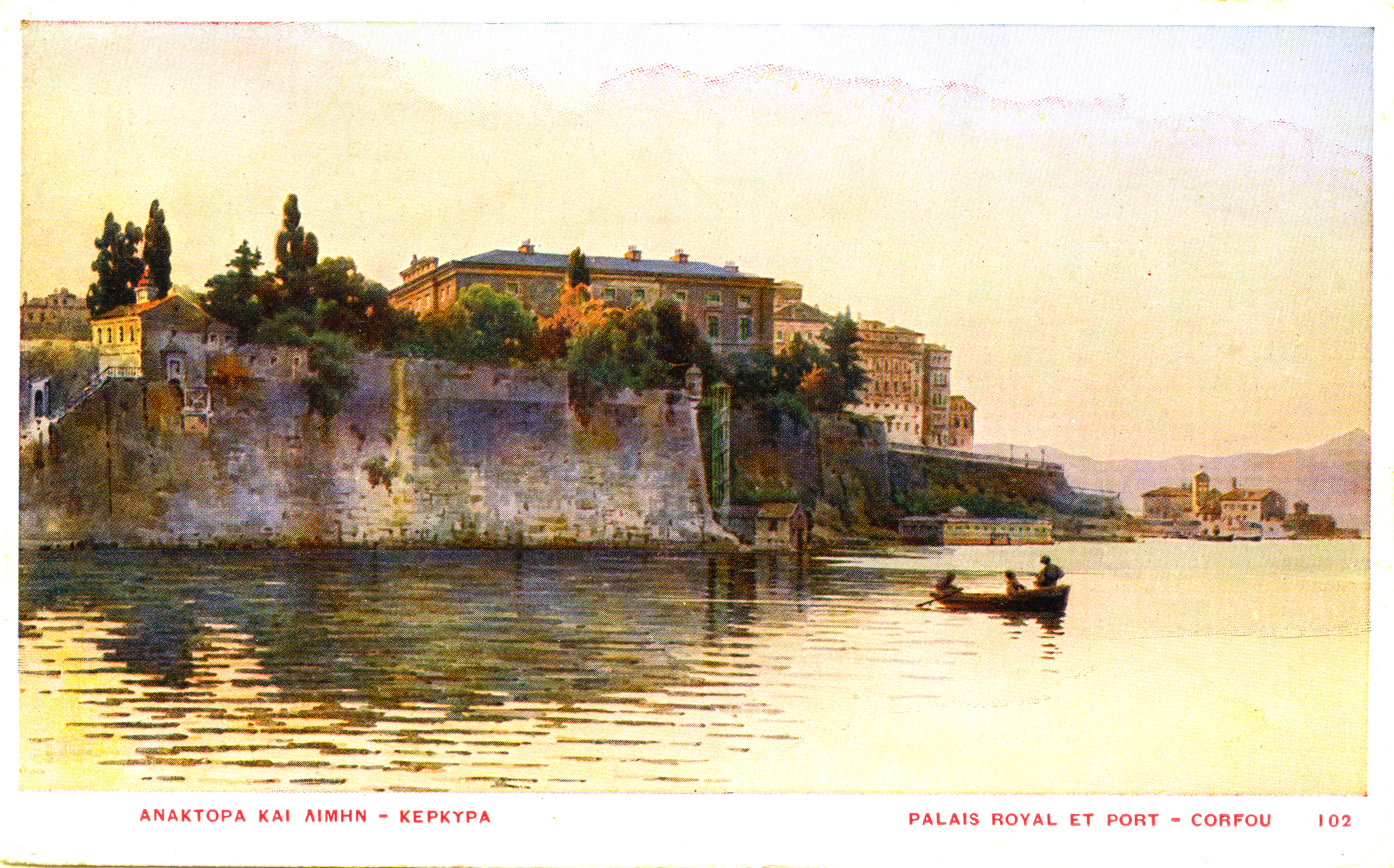
Aspiotis No. 102

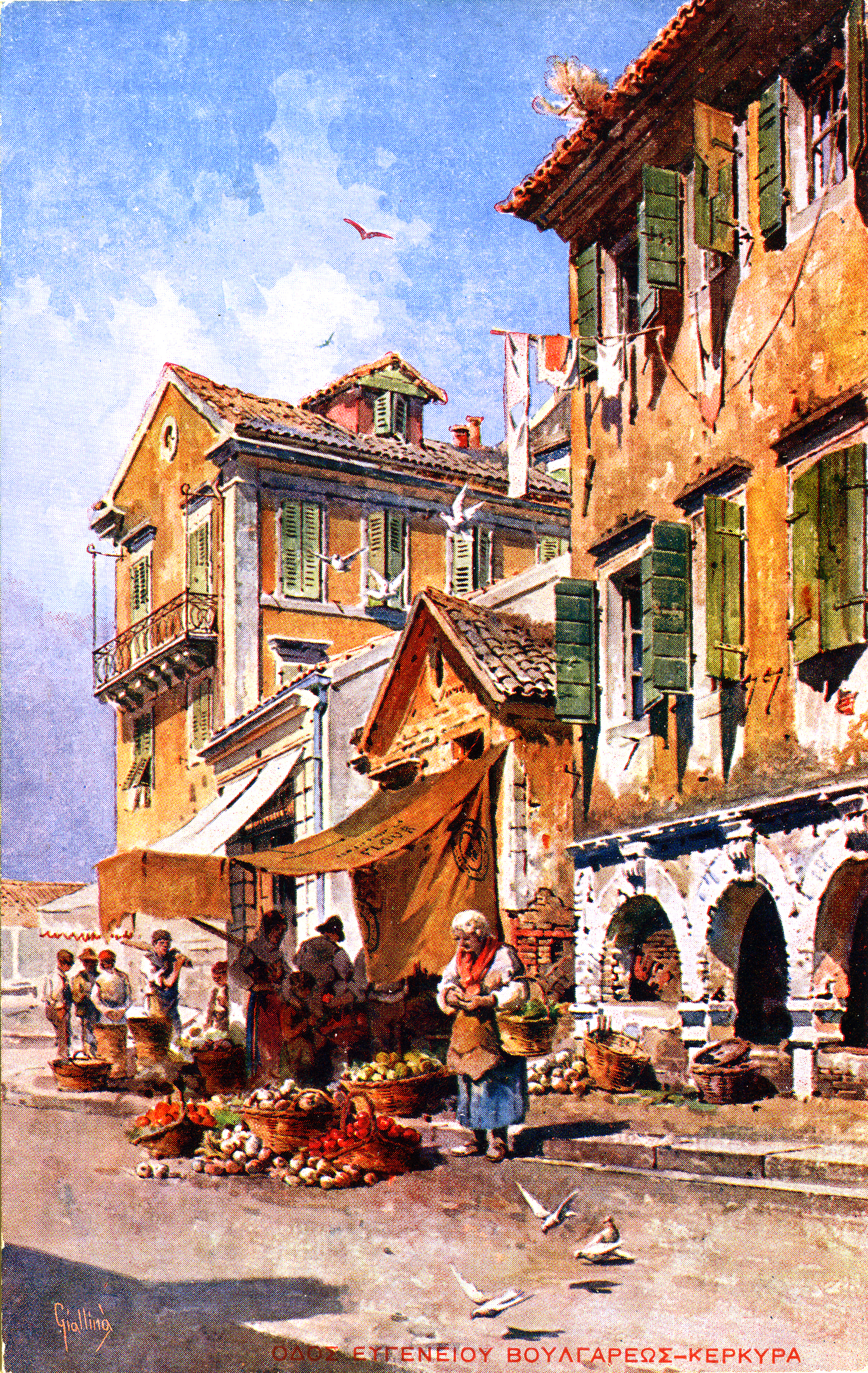
Aspiotis No. 103

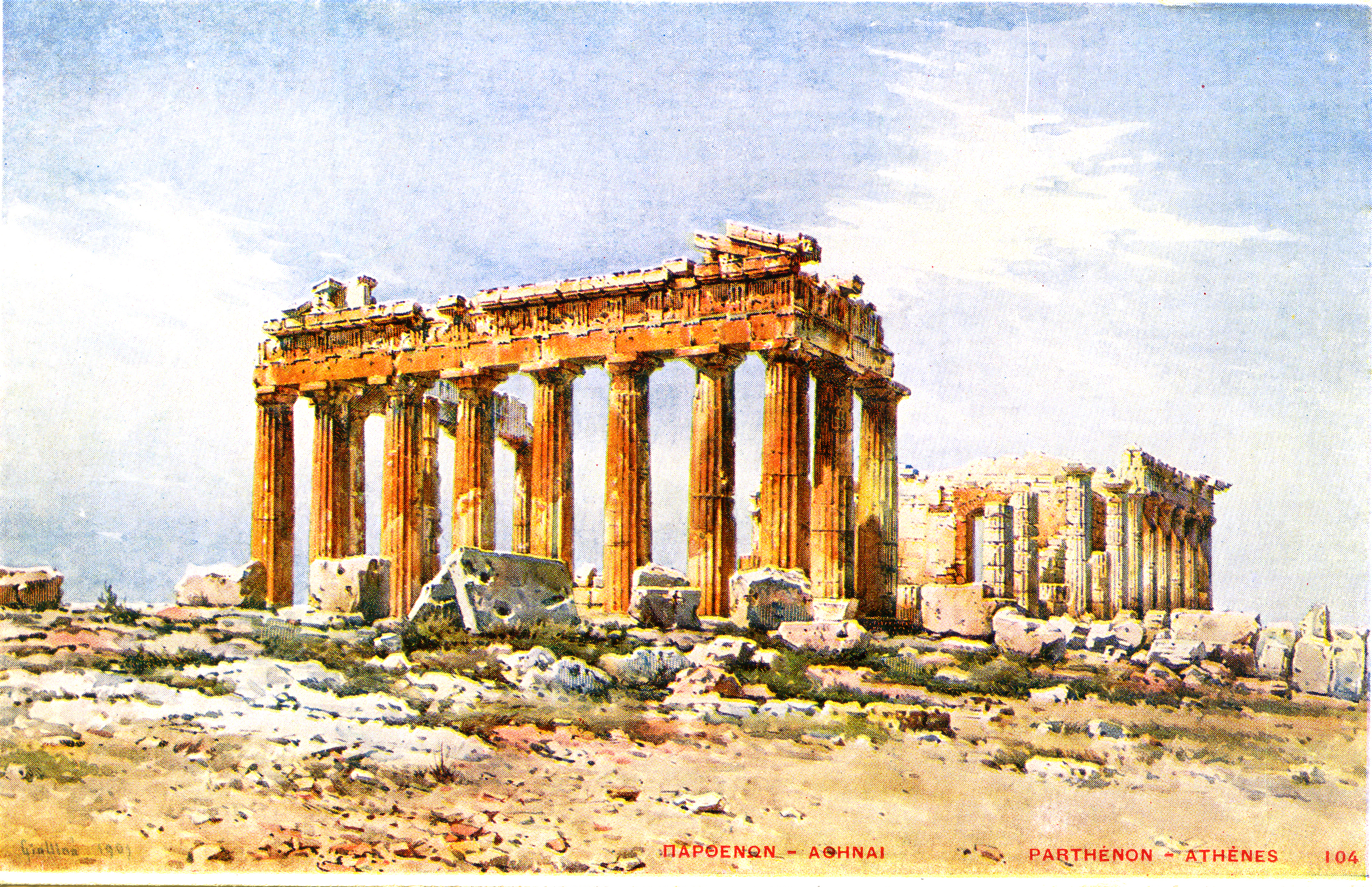
Aspiotis No. 104

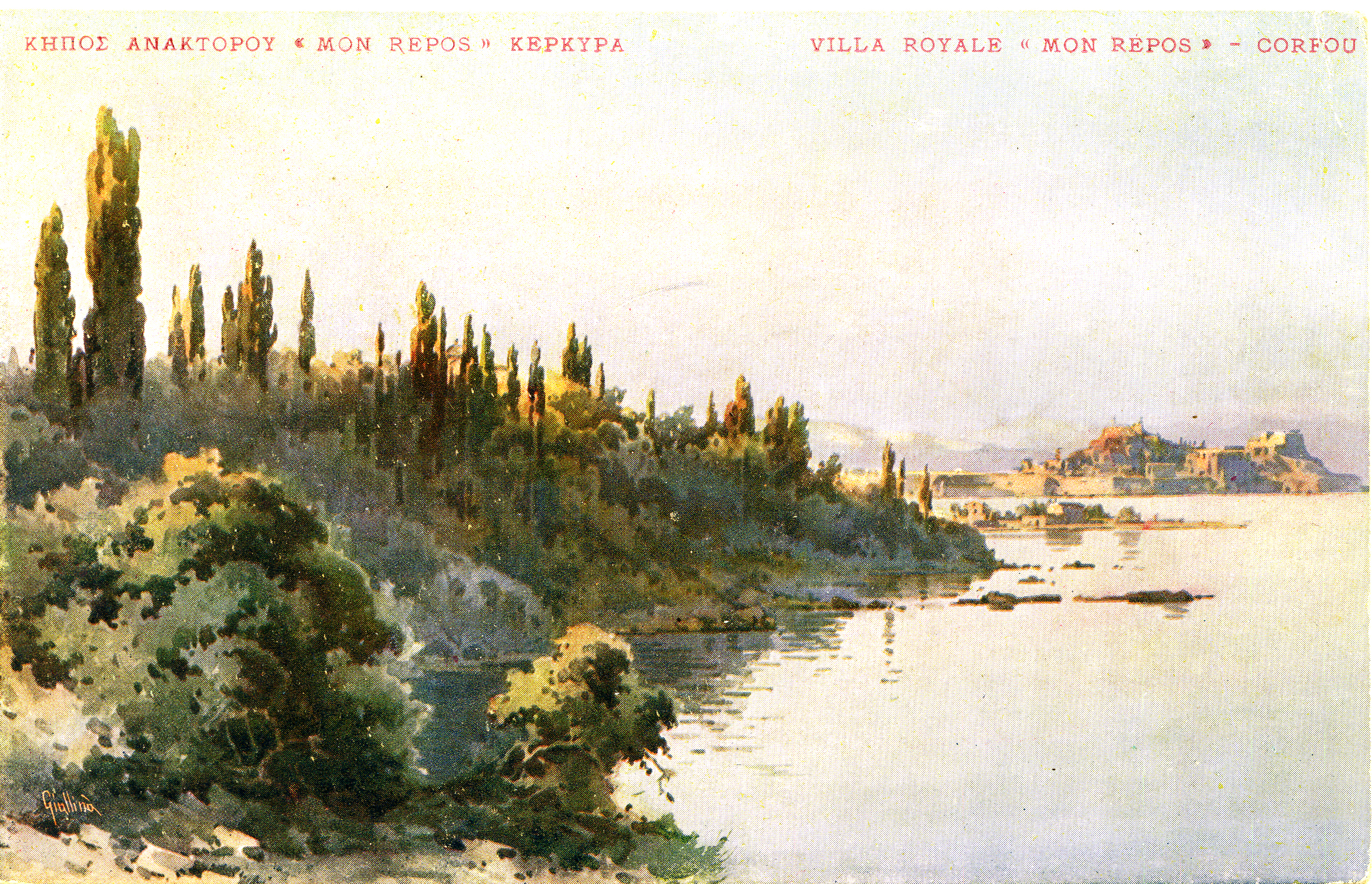
Aspiotis No. 105

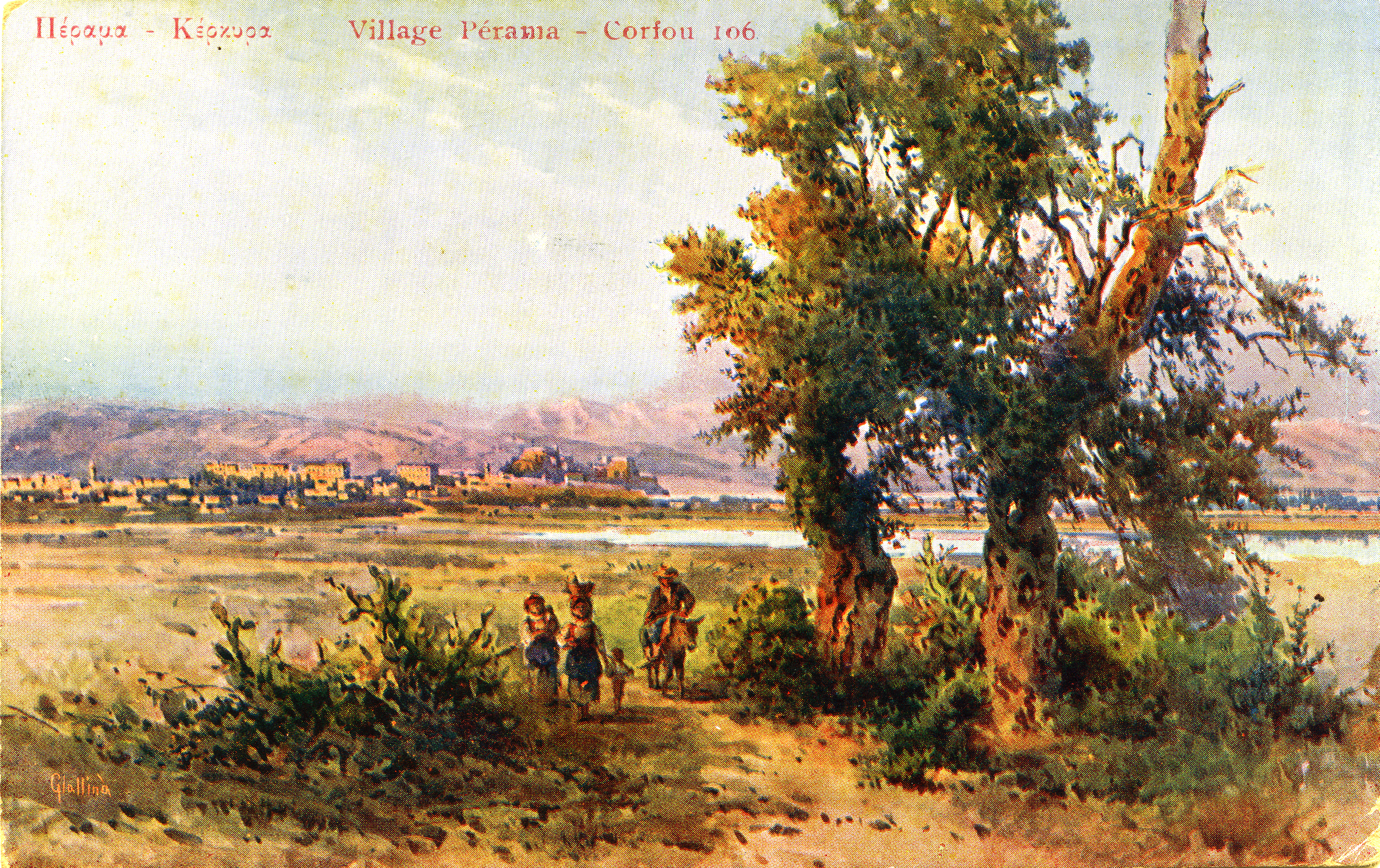
Aspiotis No. 106

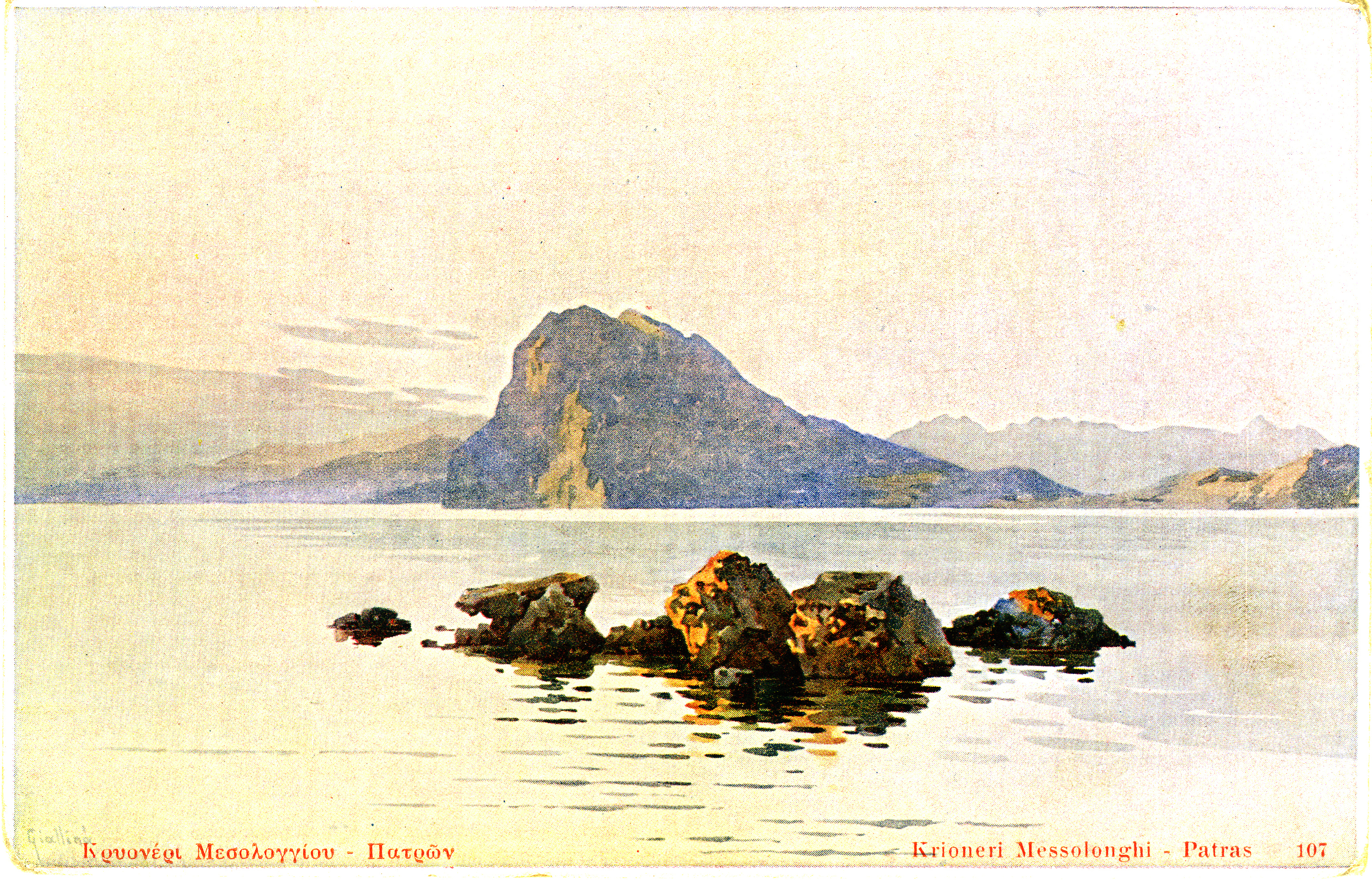
Aspiotis No. 107

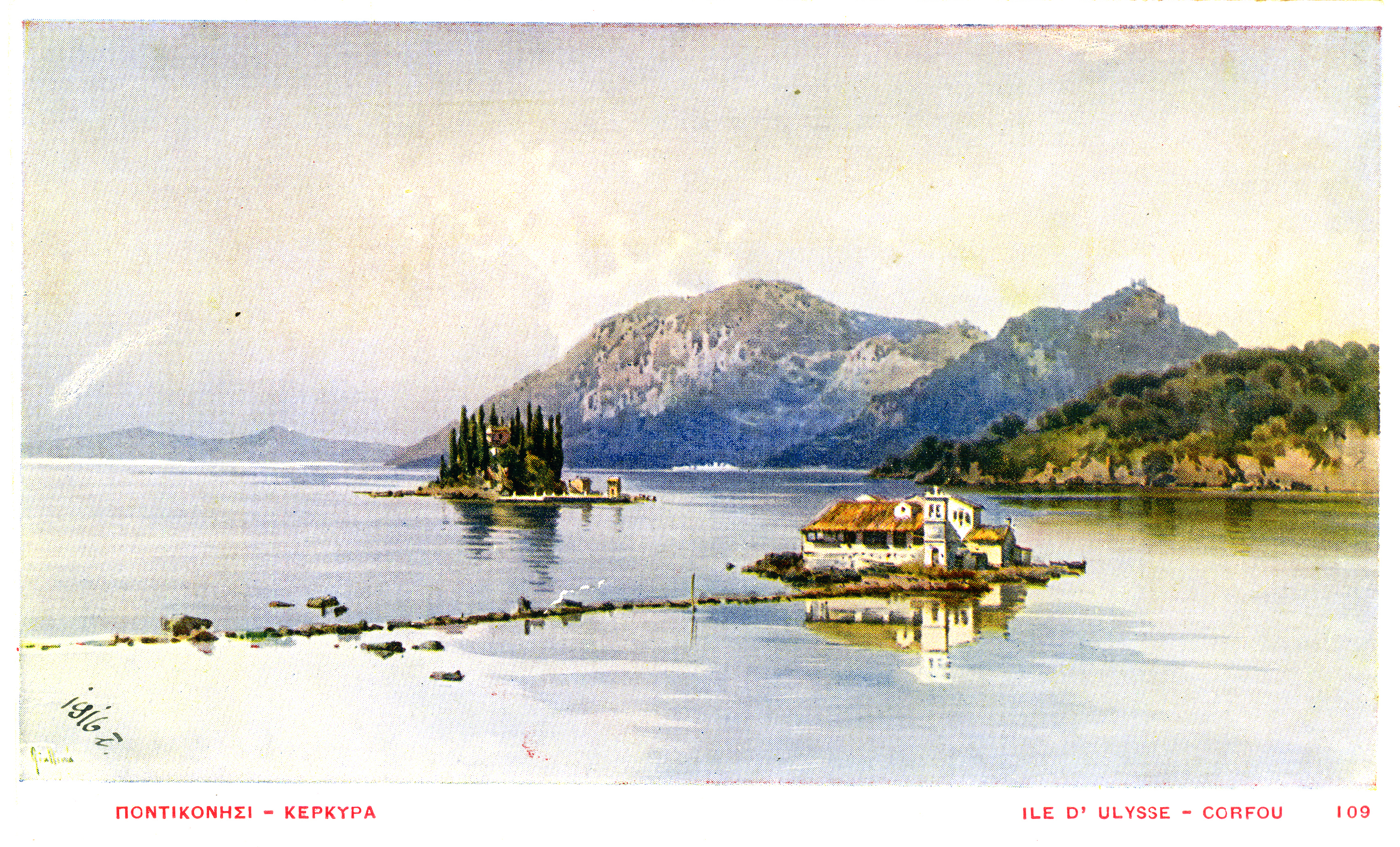
Aspiotis No. 109

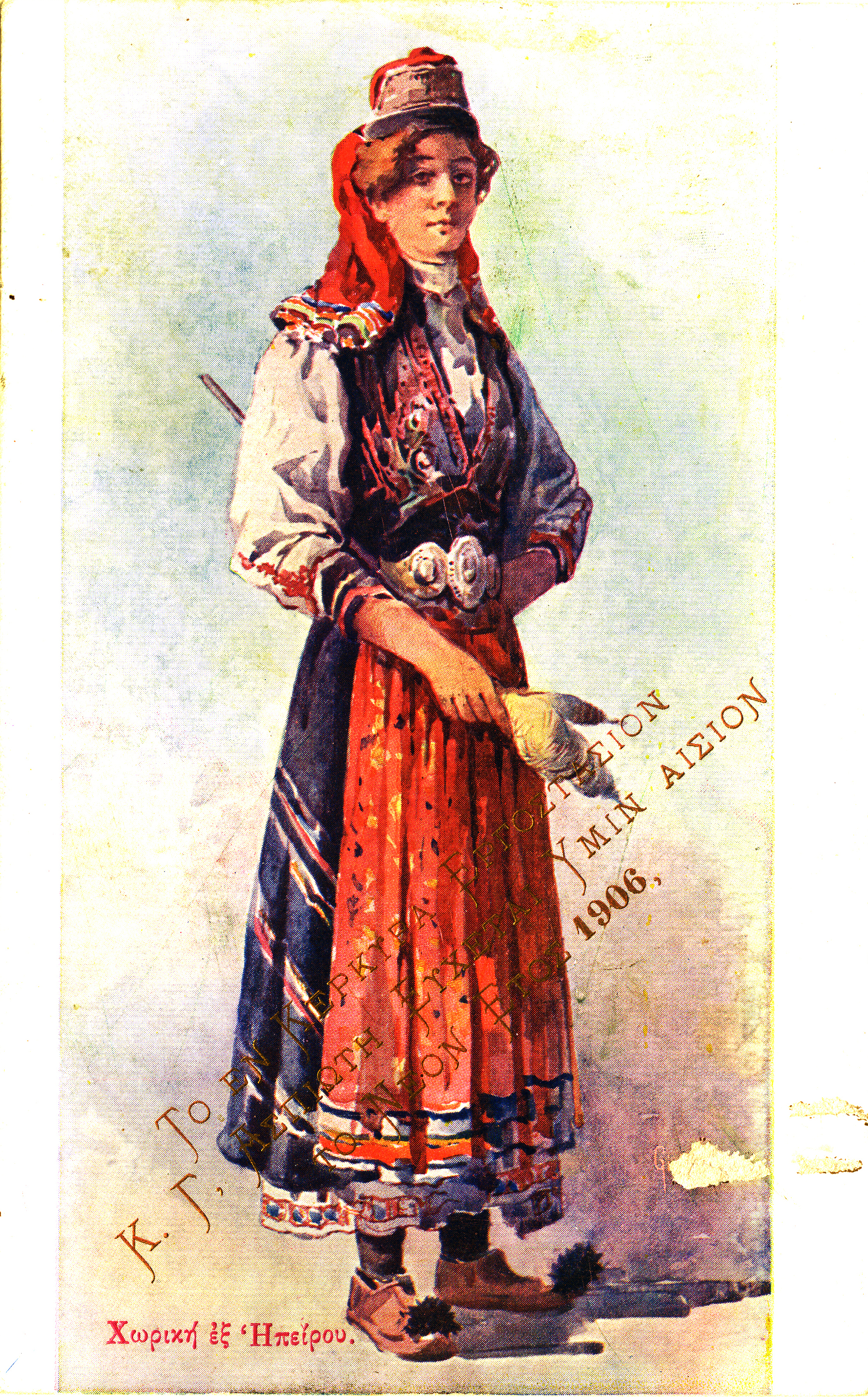
Aspiotis No. 110

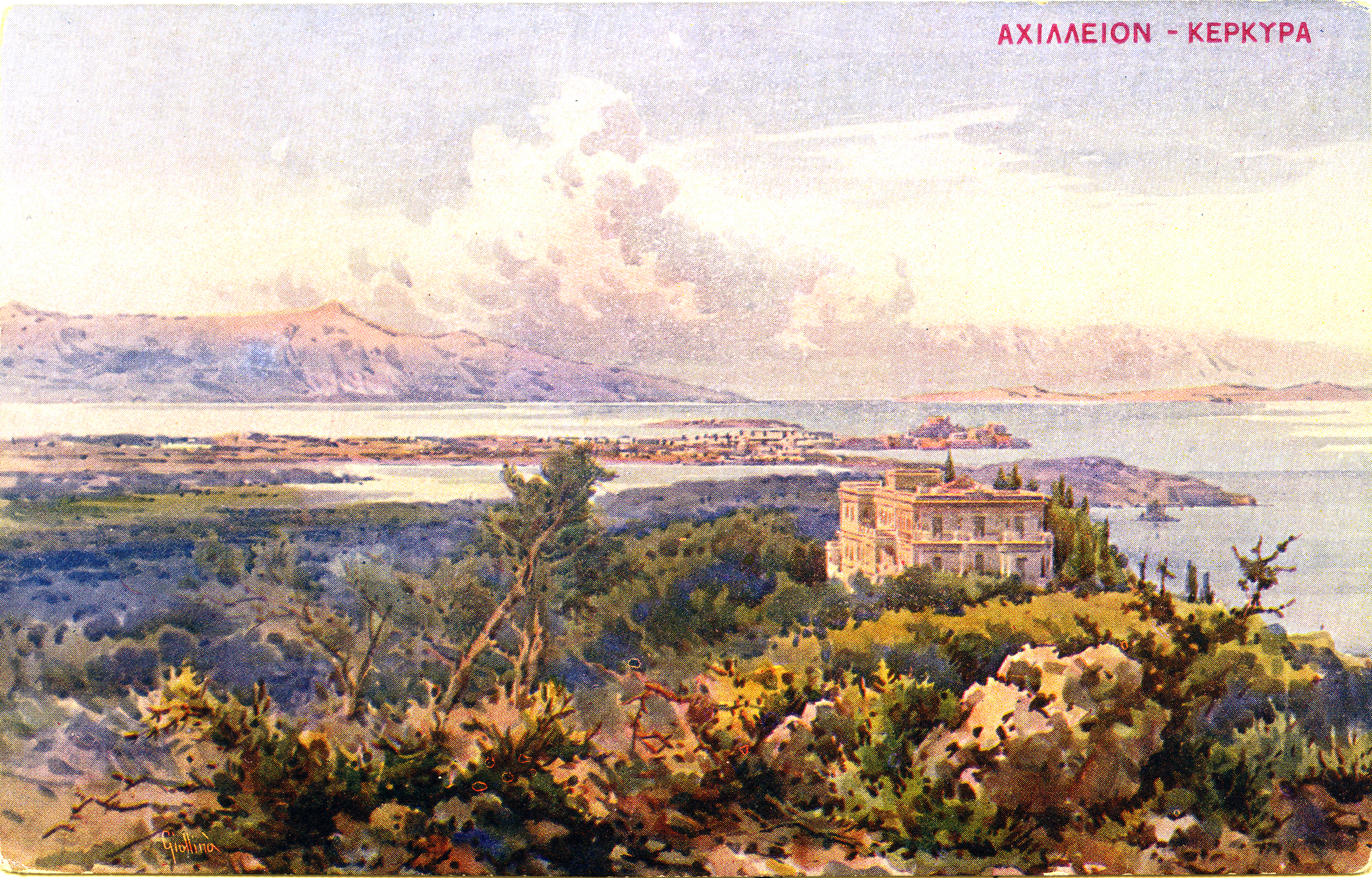
Aspiotis No. 111

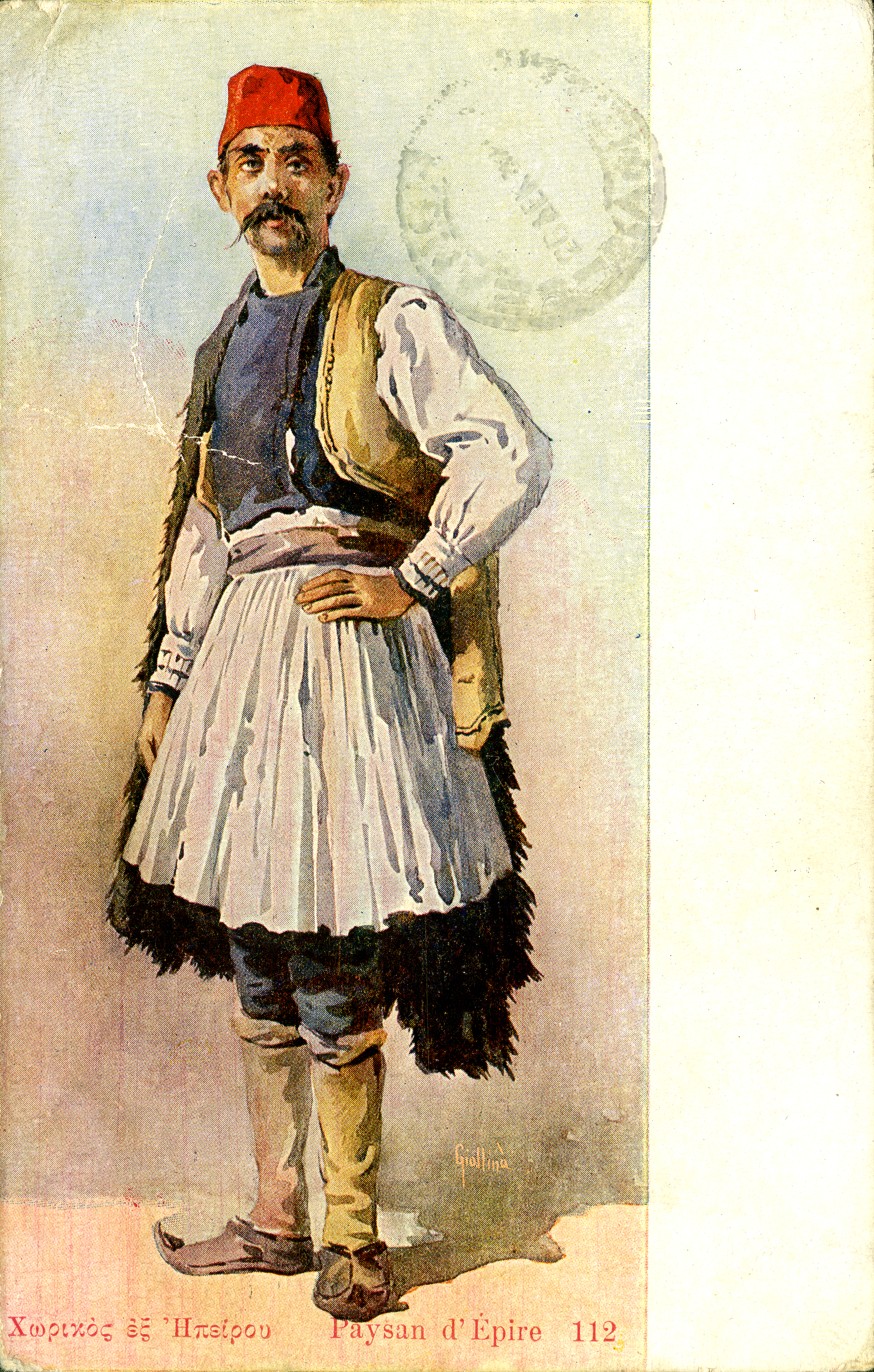
Aspiotis No. 112

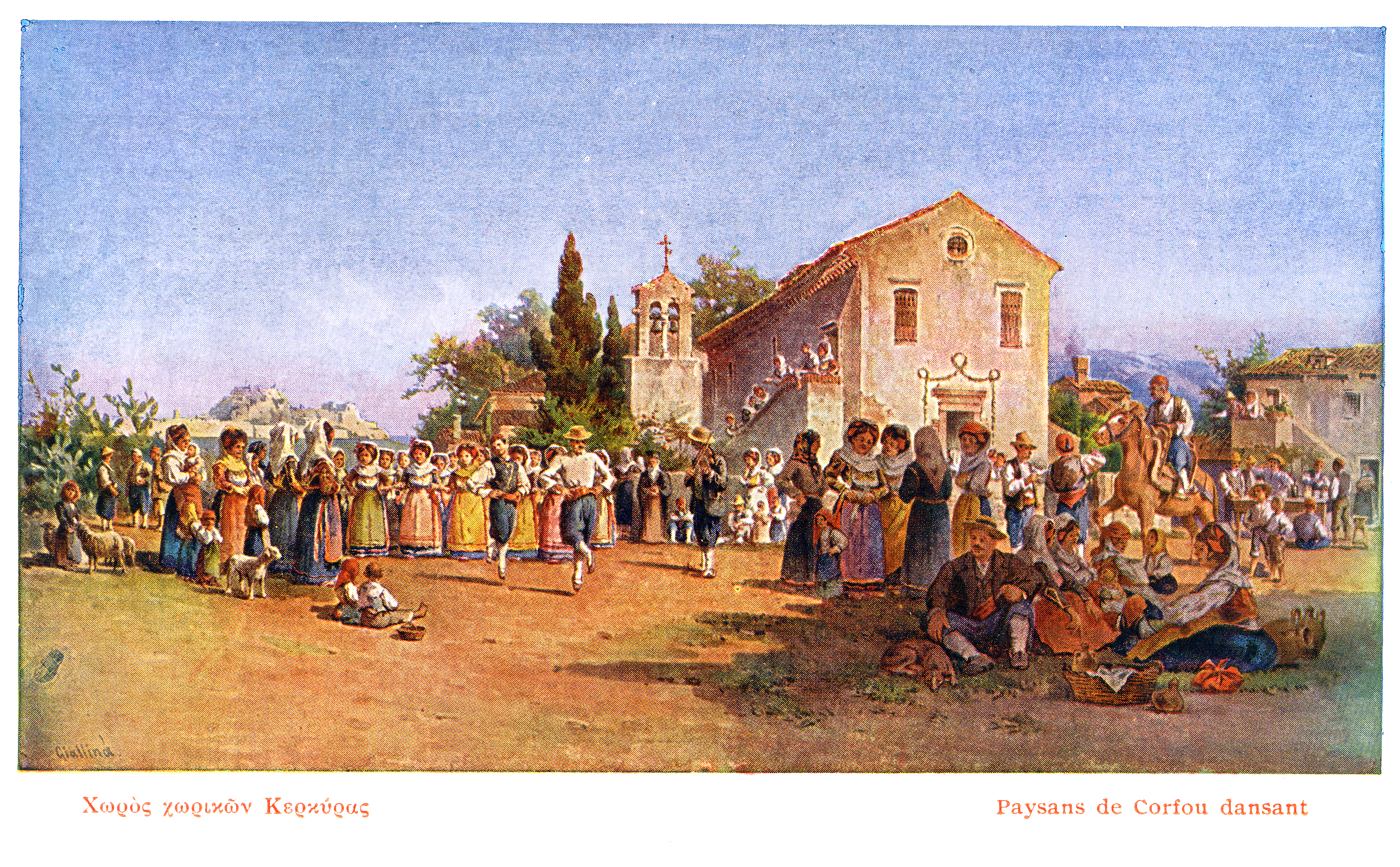
Aspiotis No. 113

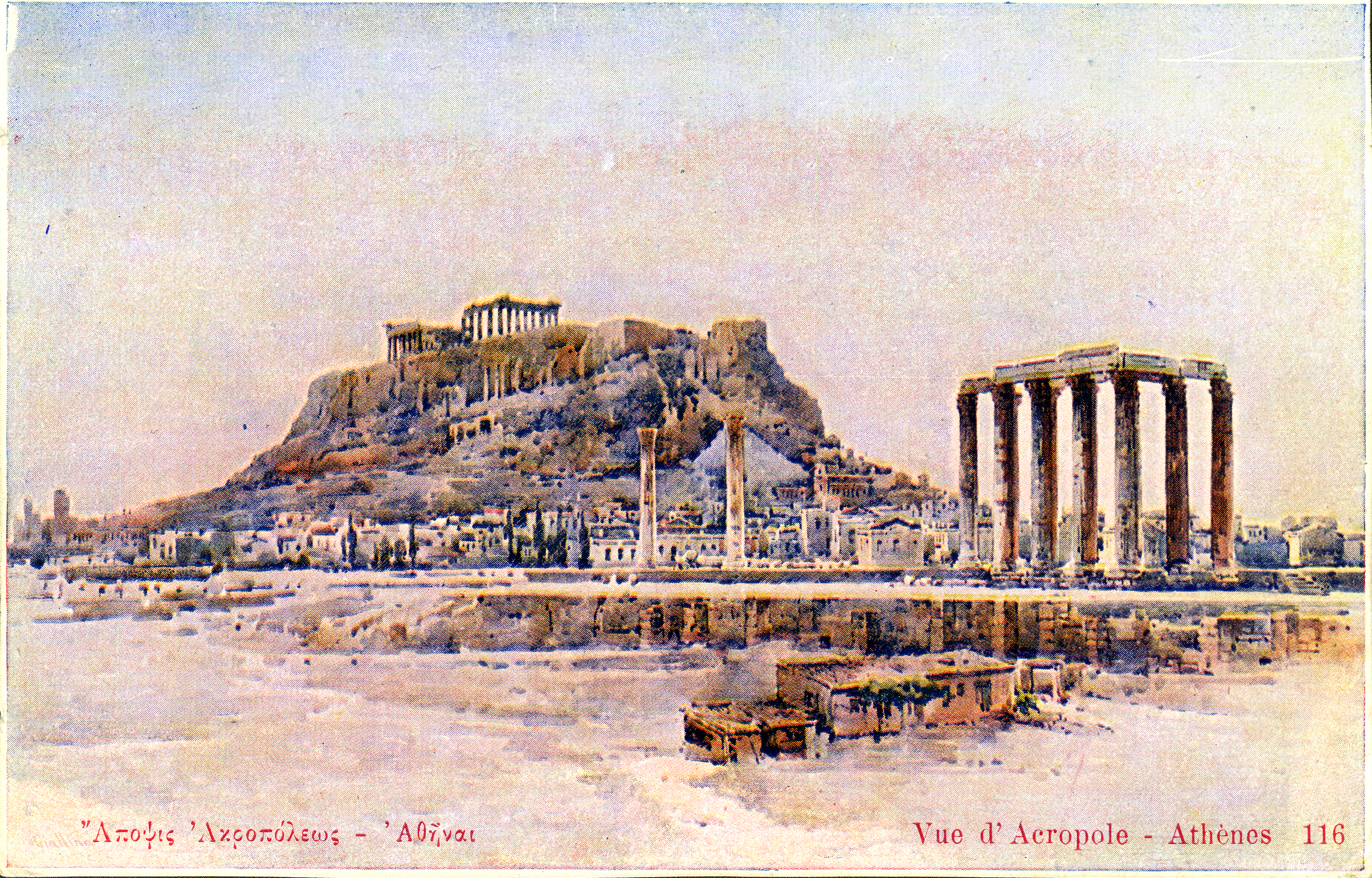
Aspiotis No. 116

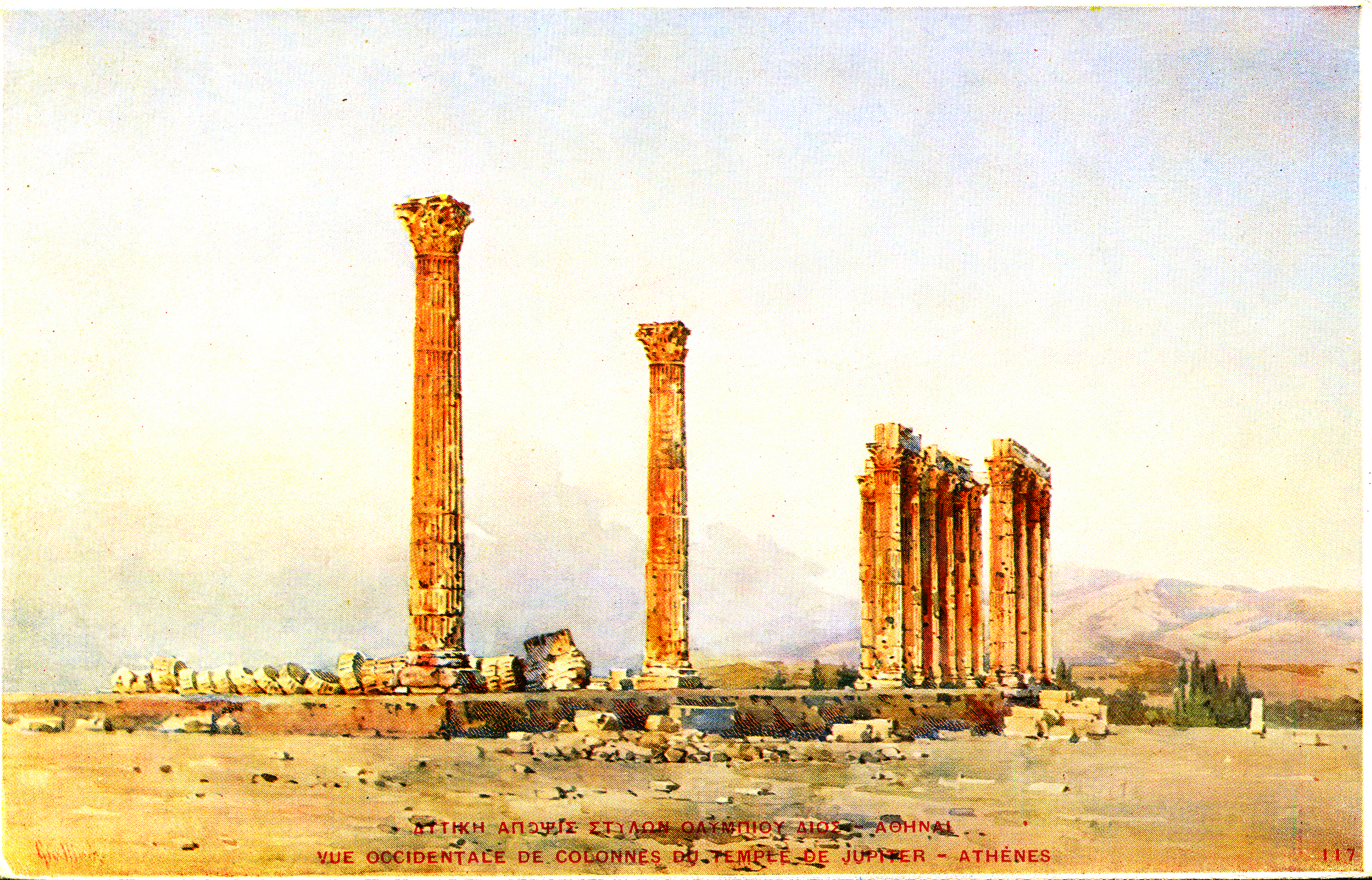
Aspiotis No. 117

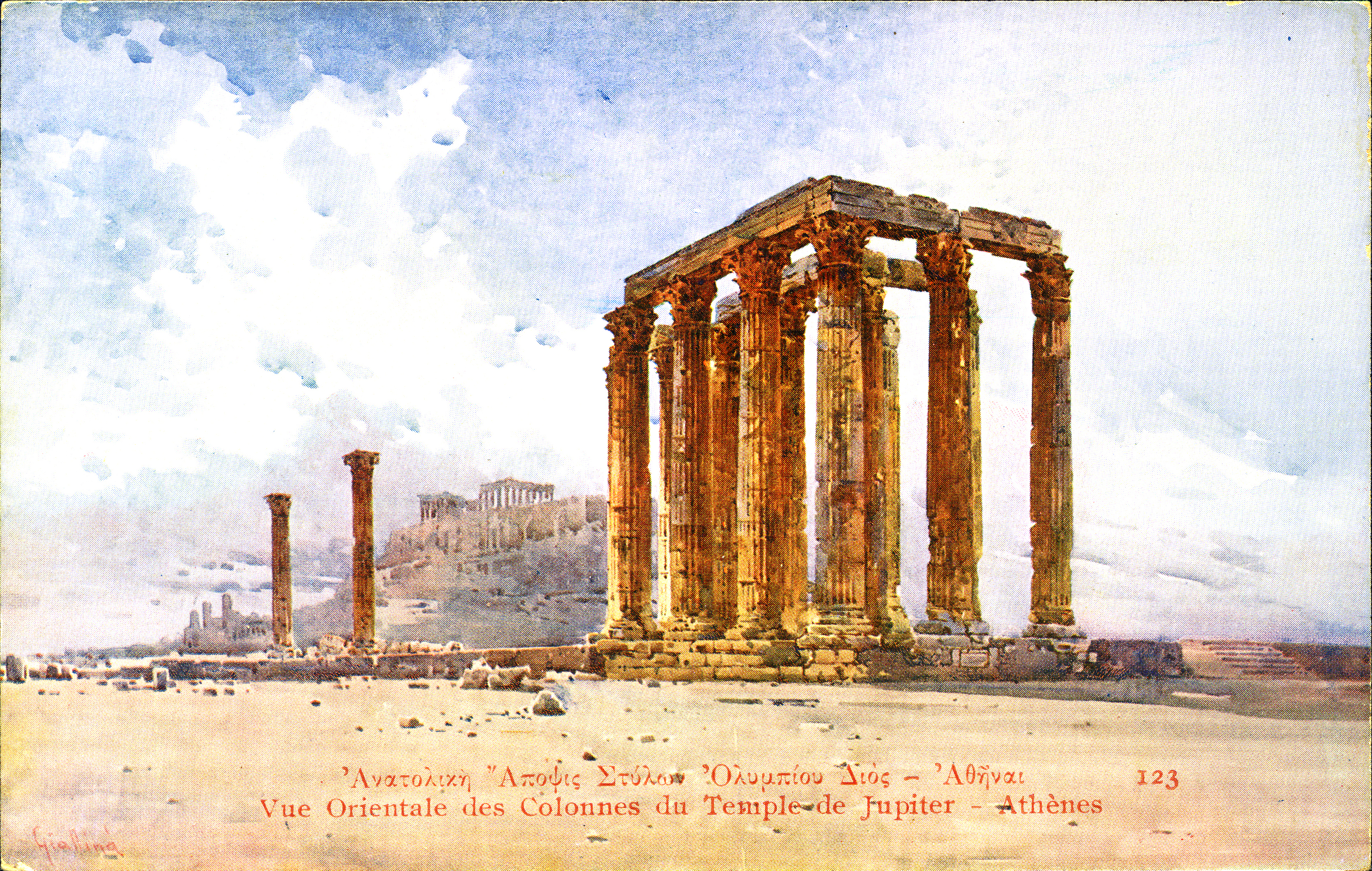
Aspiotis No. 123

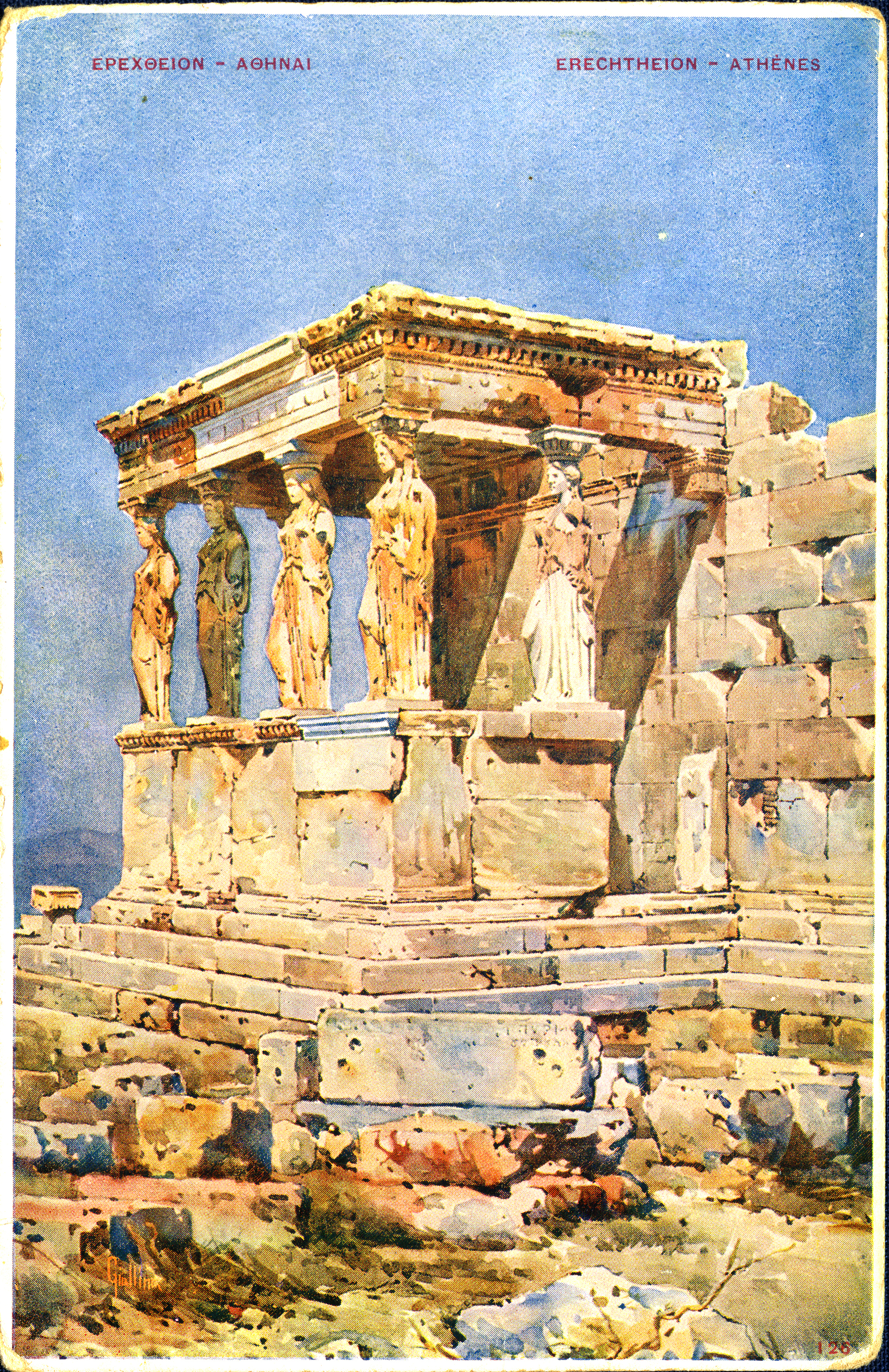
Aspiotis No. 126

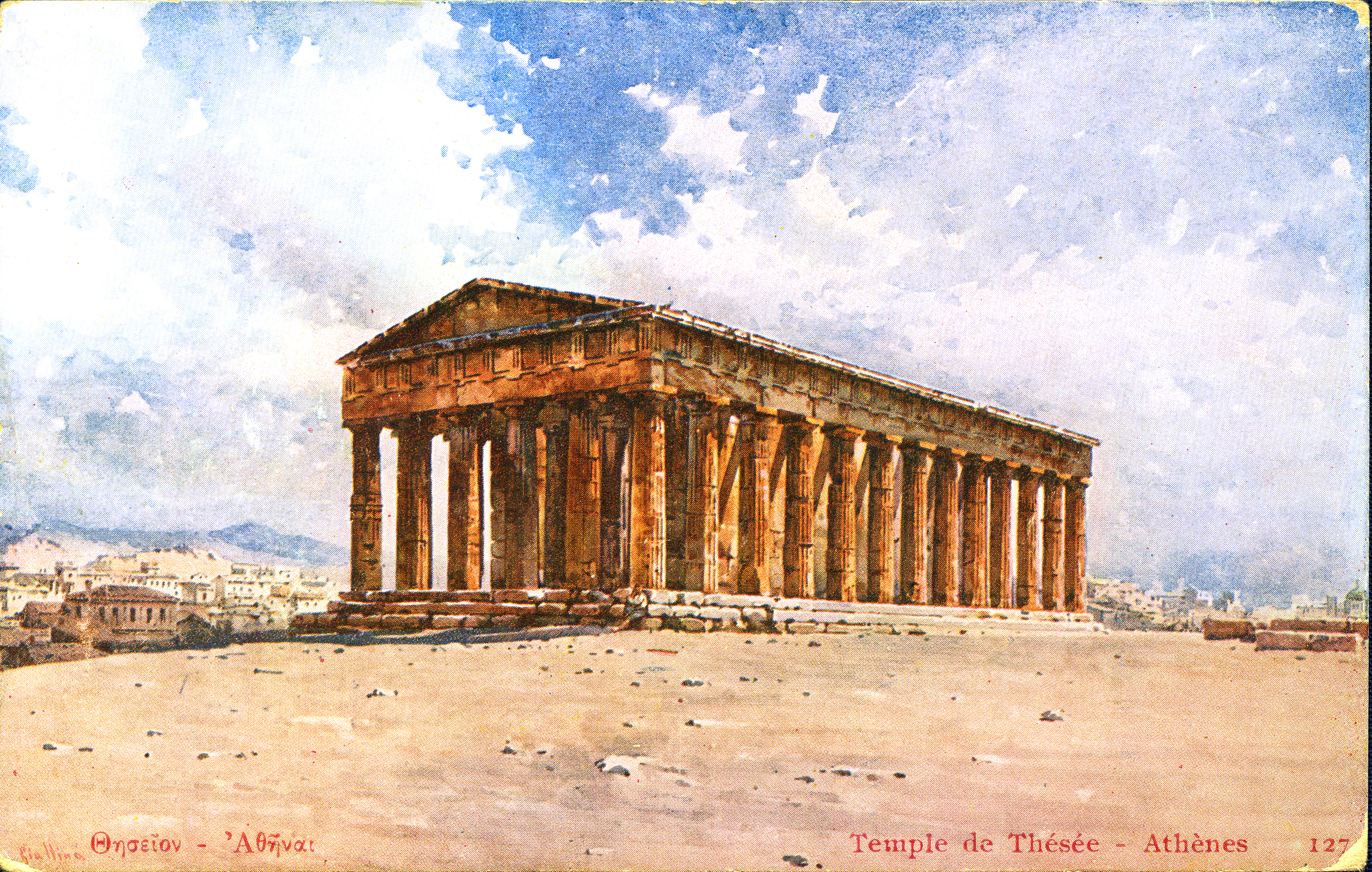
Aspiotis No. 127

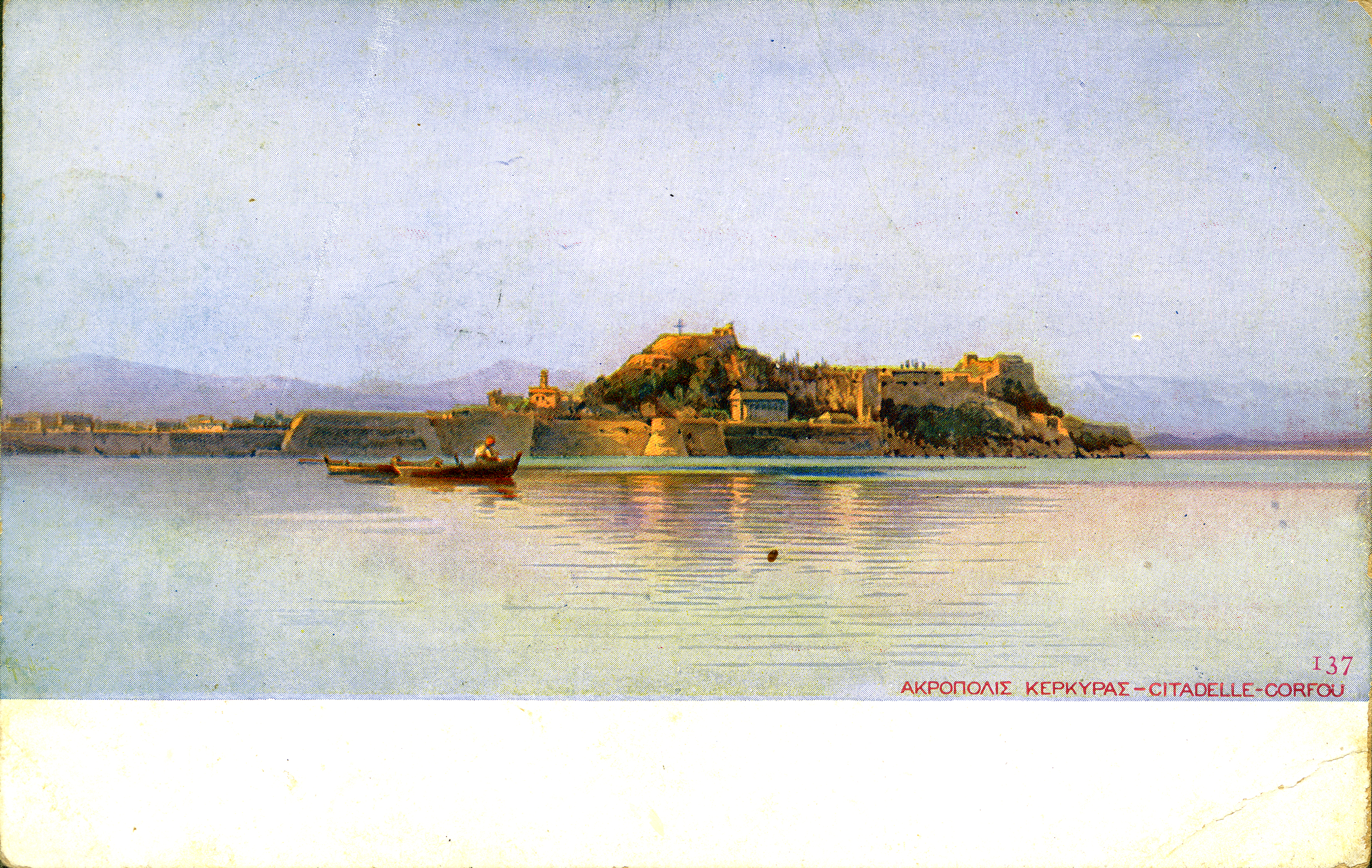
Aspiotis No. 137

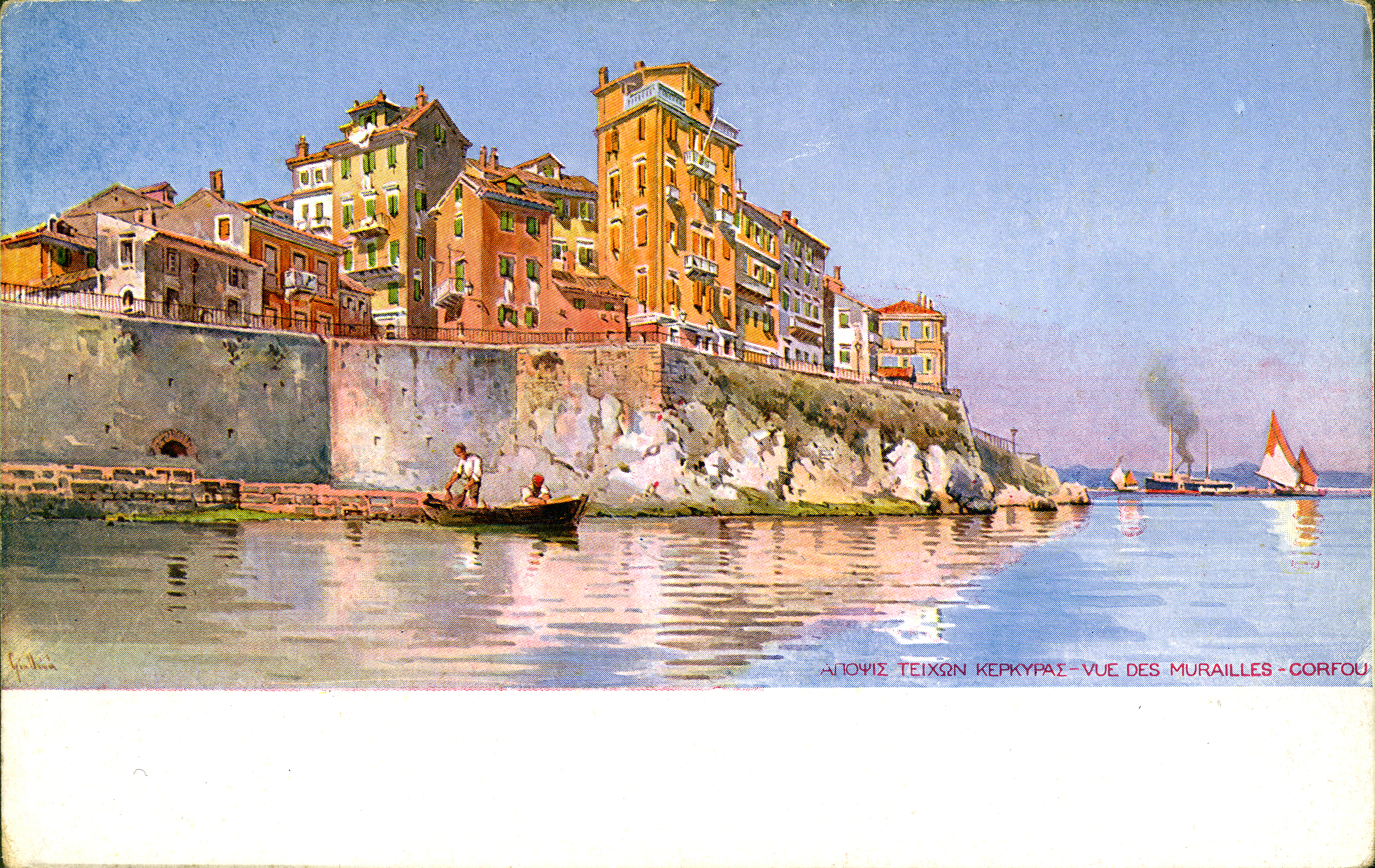
Aspiotis No. 139

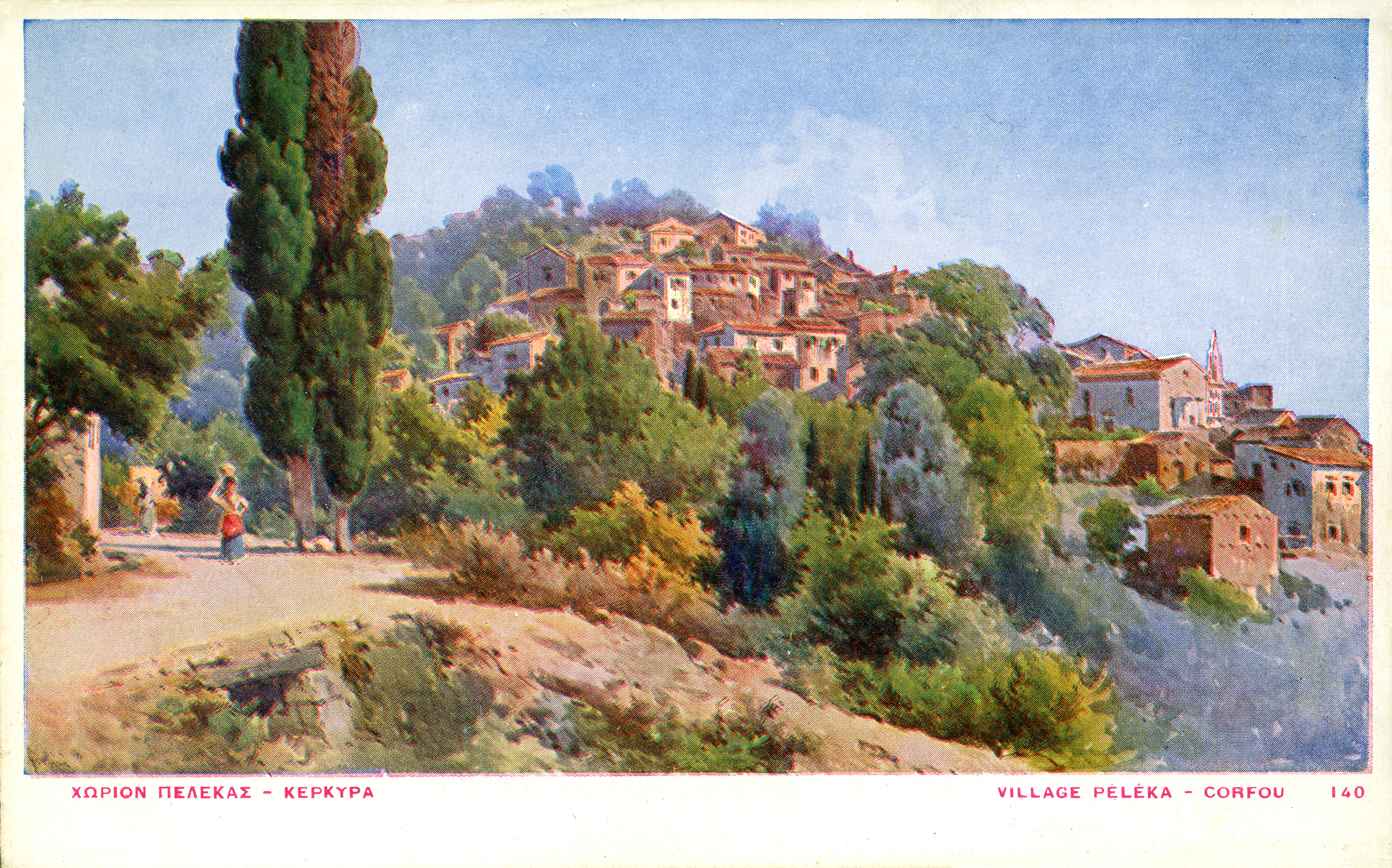
Aspiotis No. 140

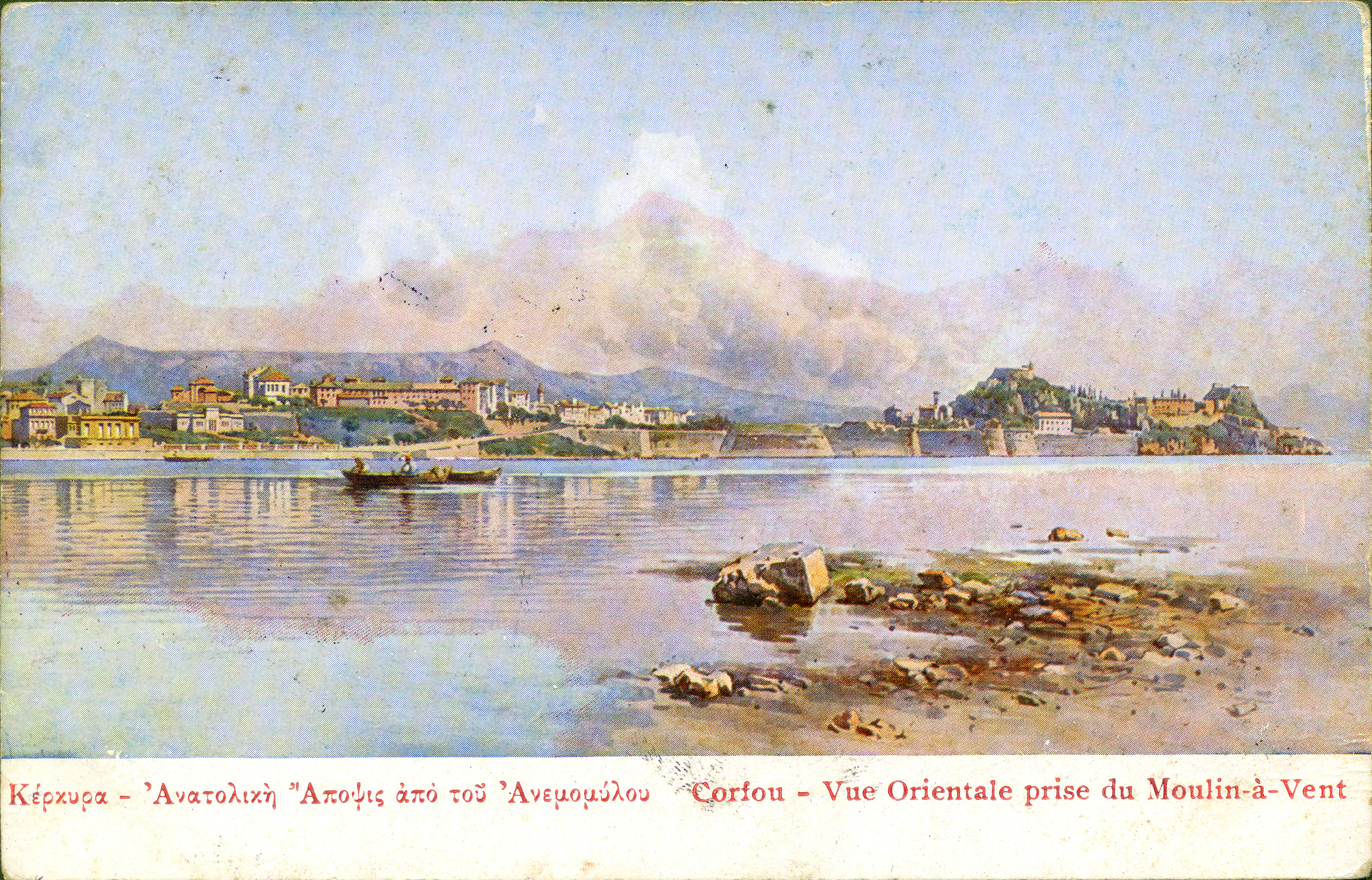
Aspiotis No. 141

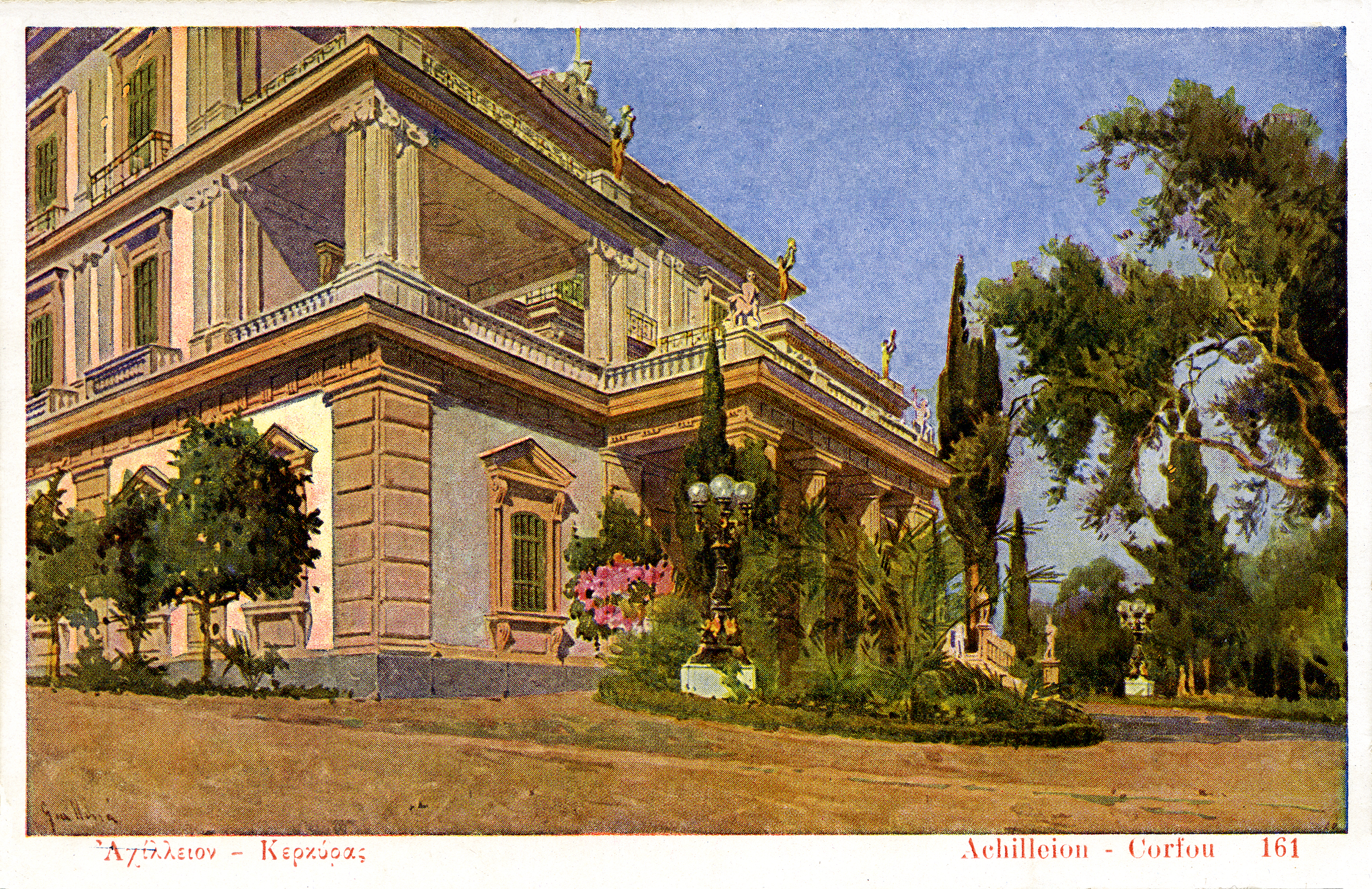
Aspiotis No. 161

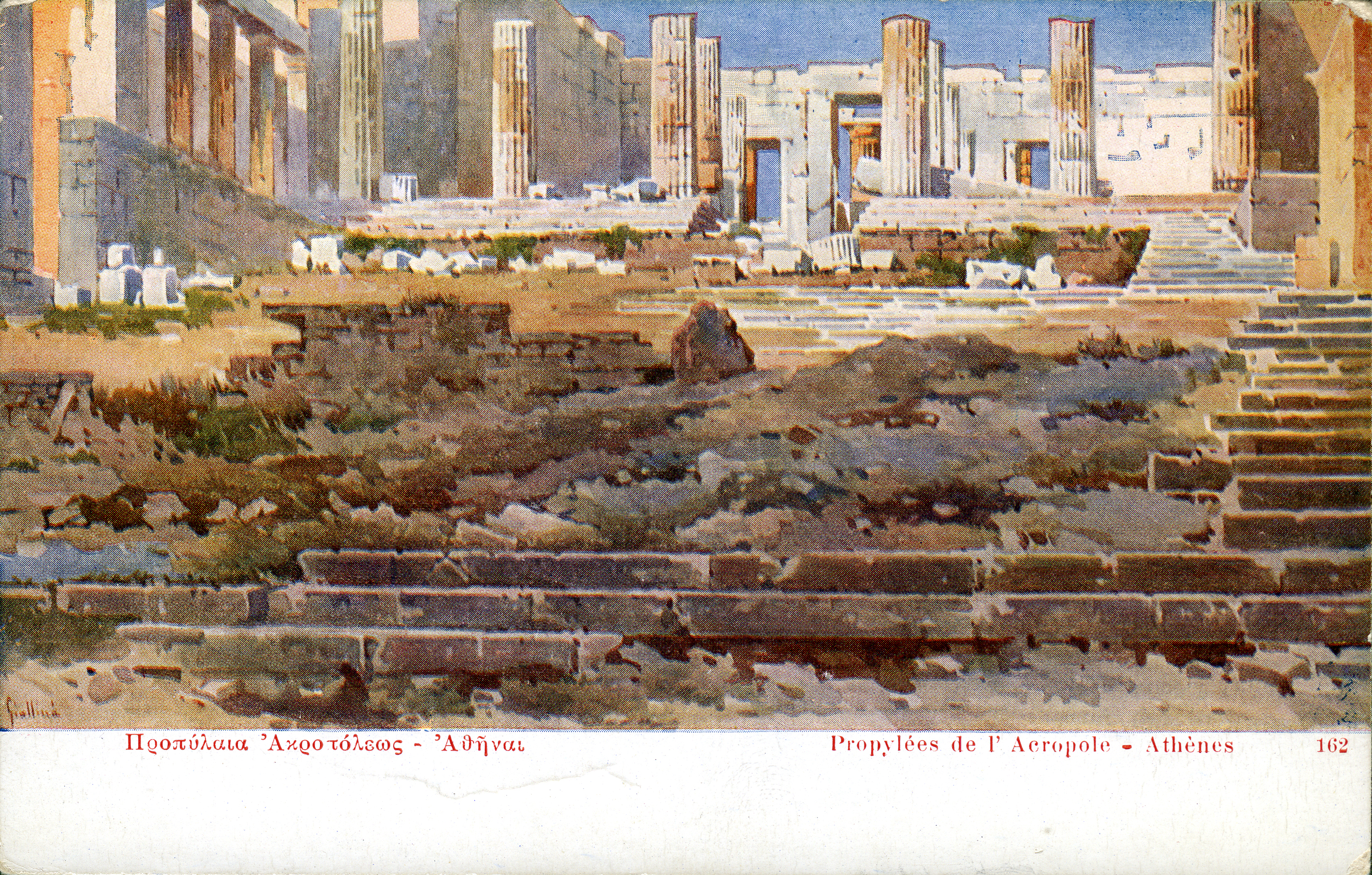
Aspiotis No. 162

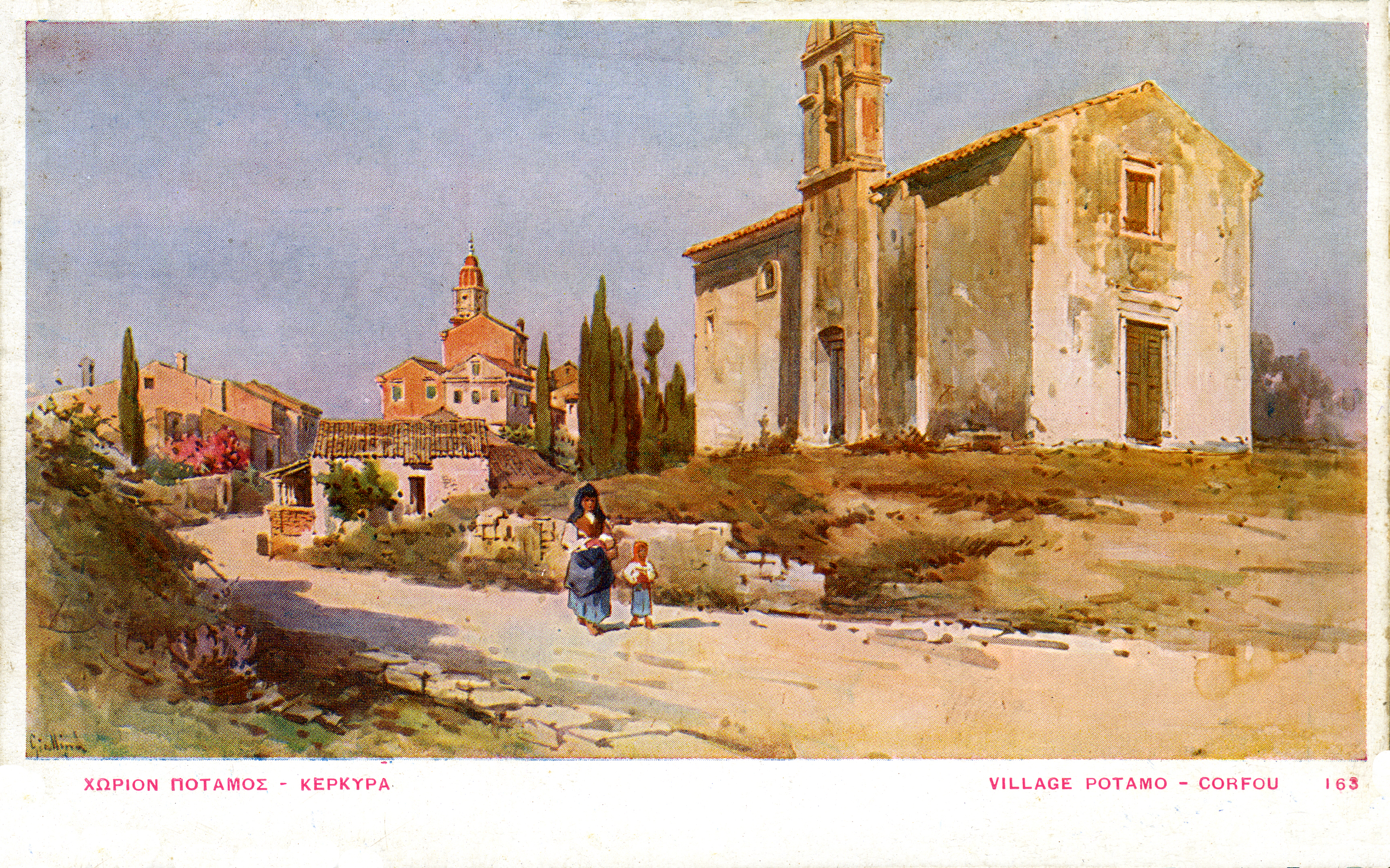
Aspiotis No. 163

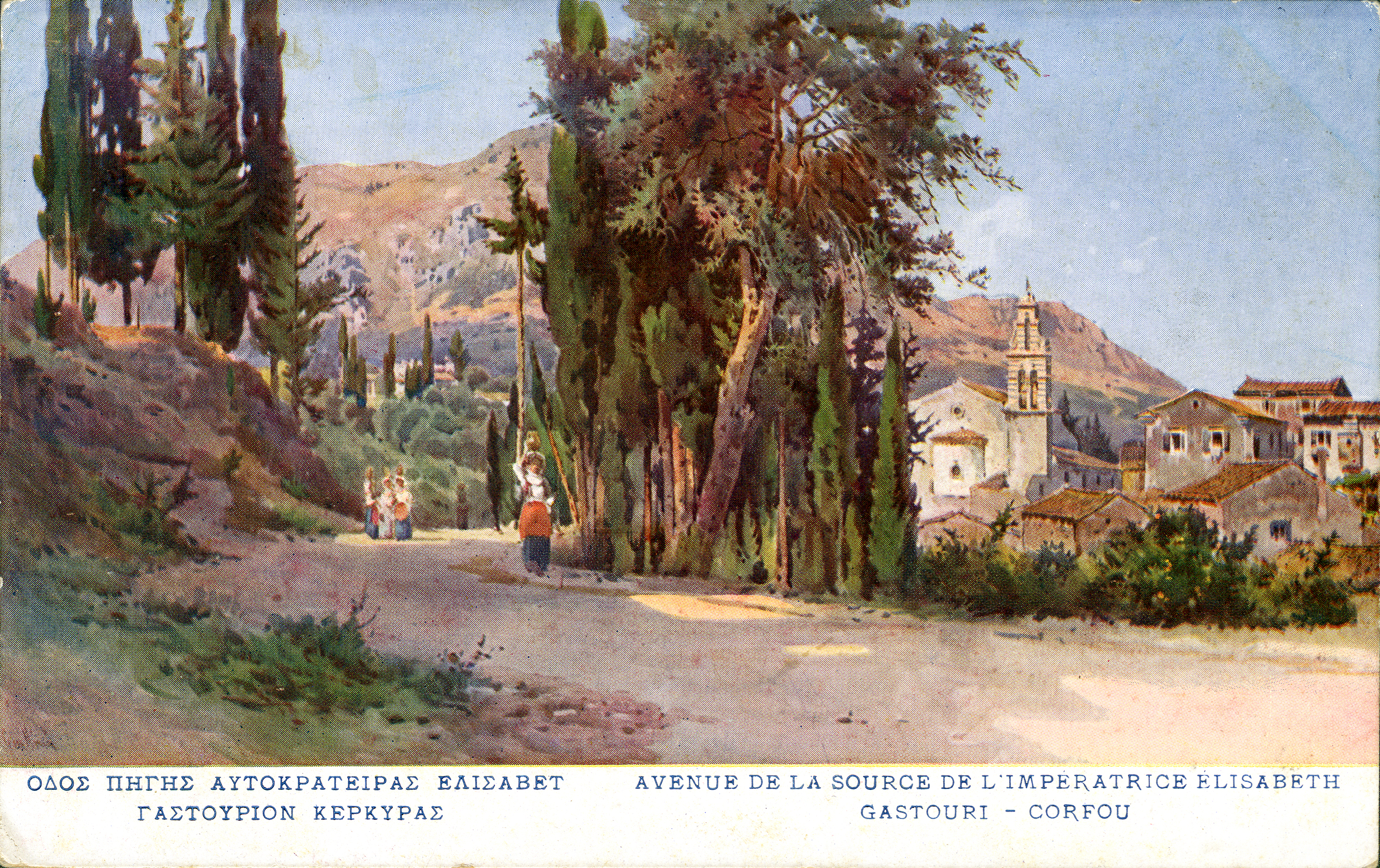
Aspiotis No. 164

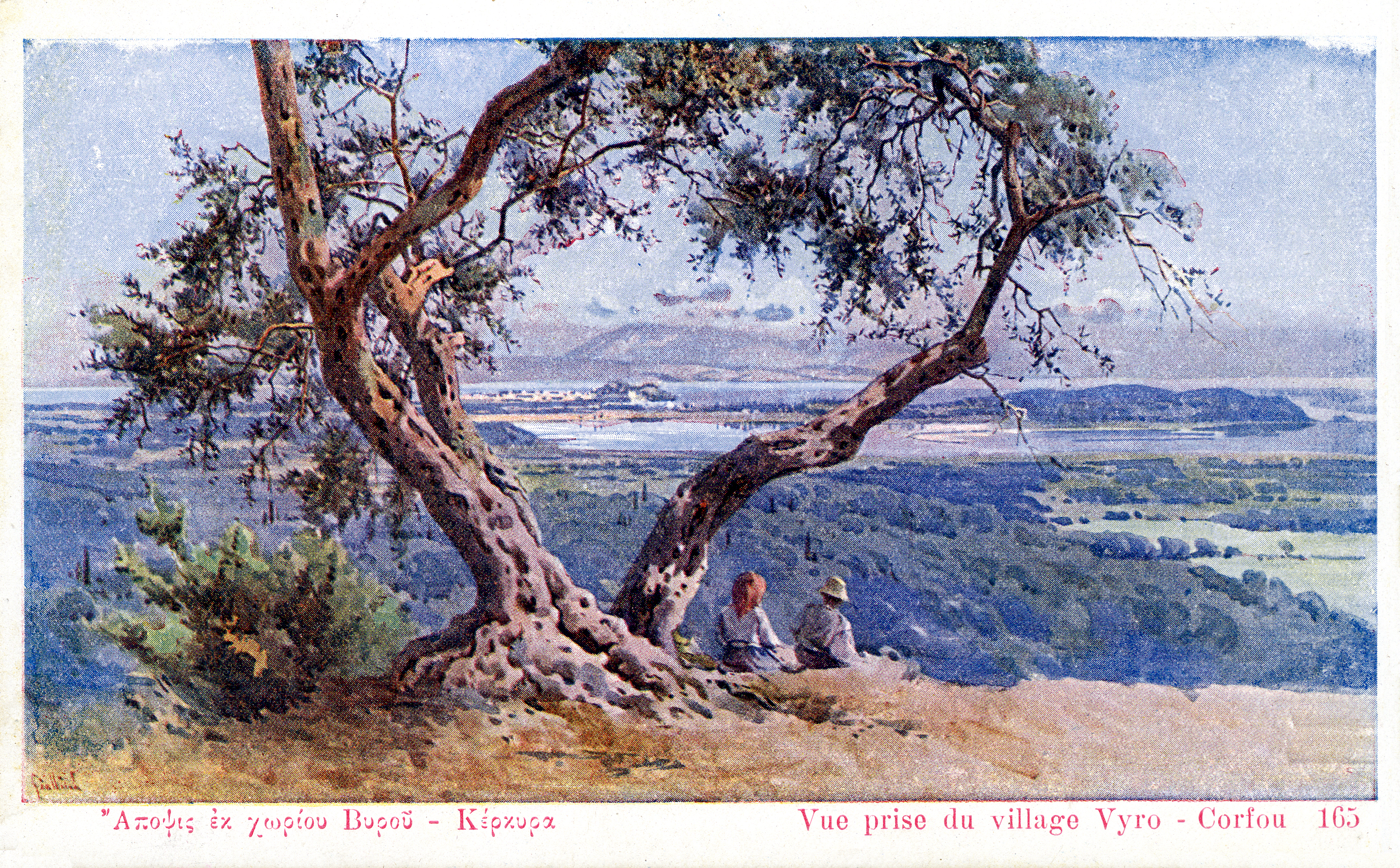
Aspiotis No. 165

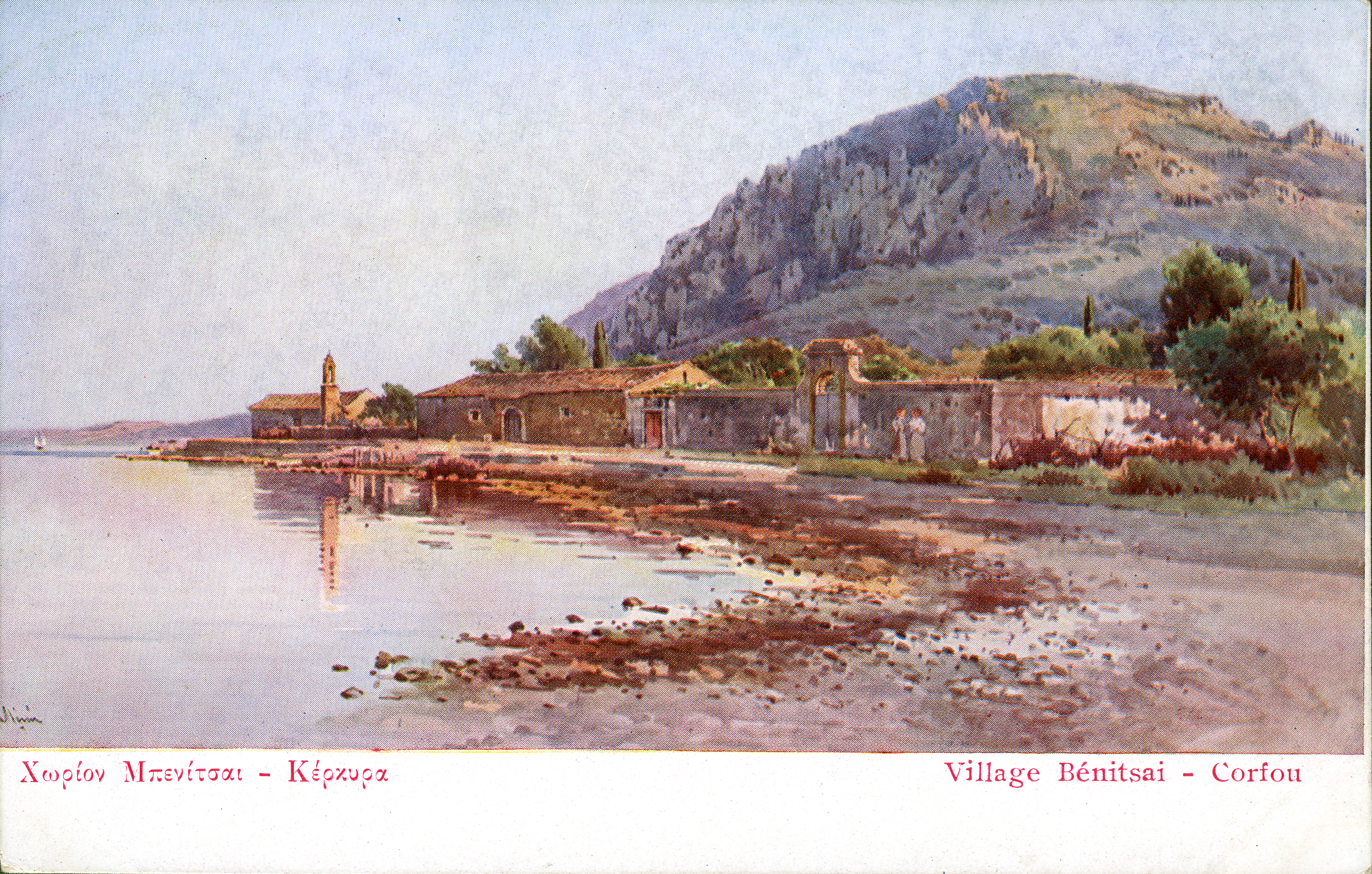
Aspiotis No. 166

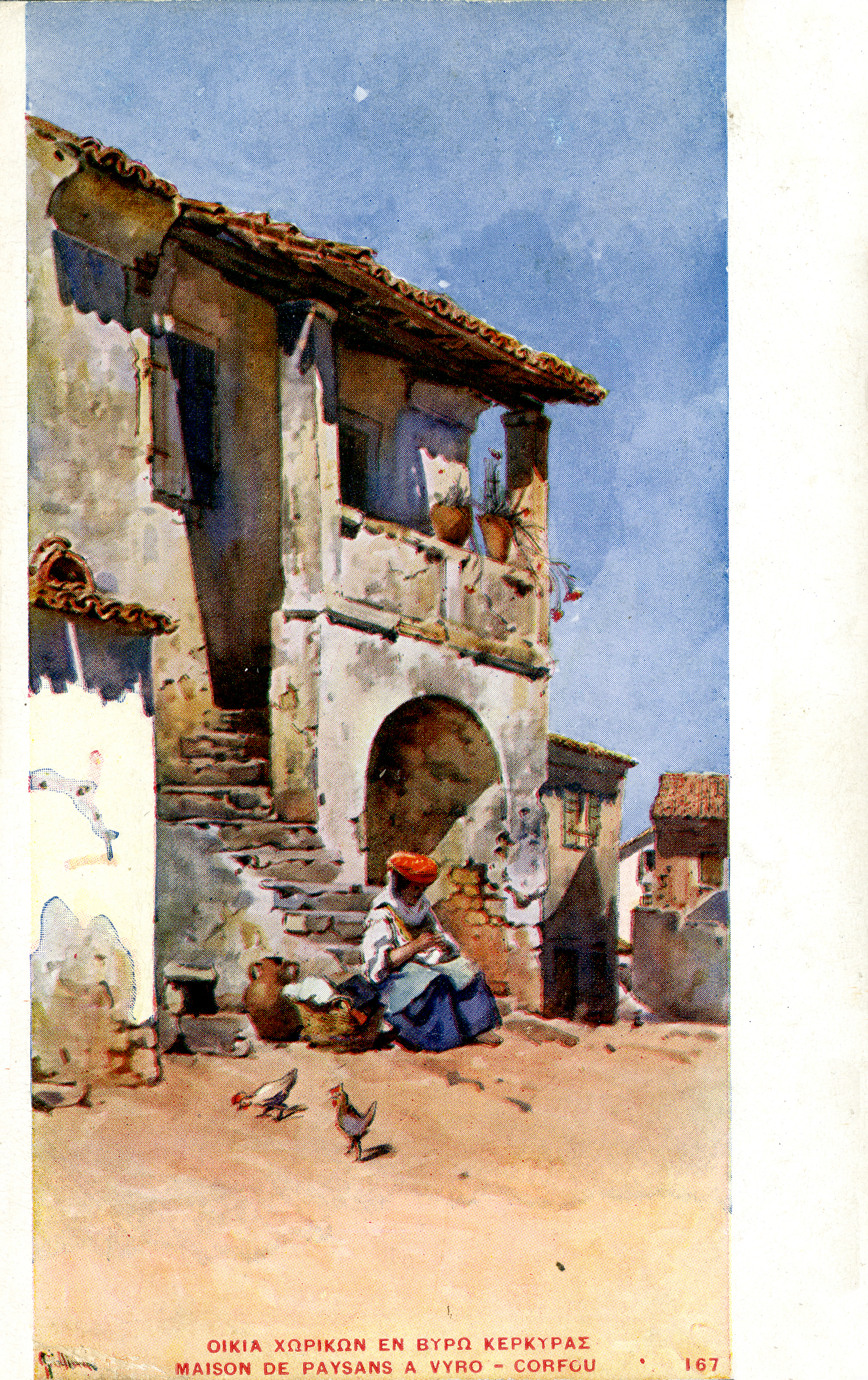
Aspiotis No. 167

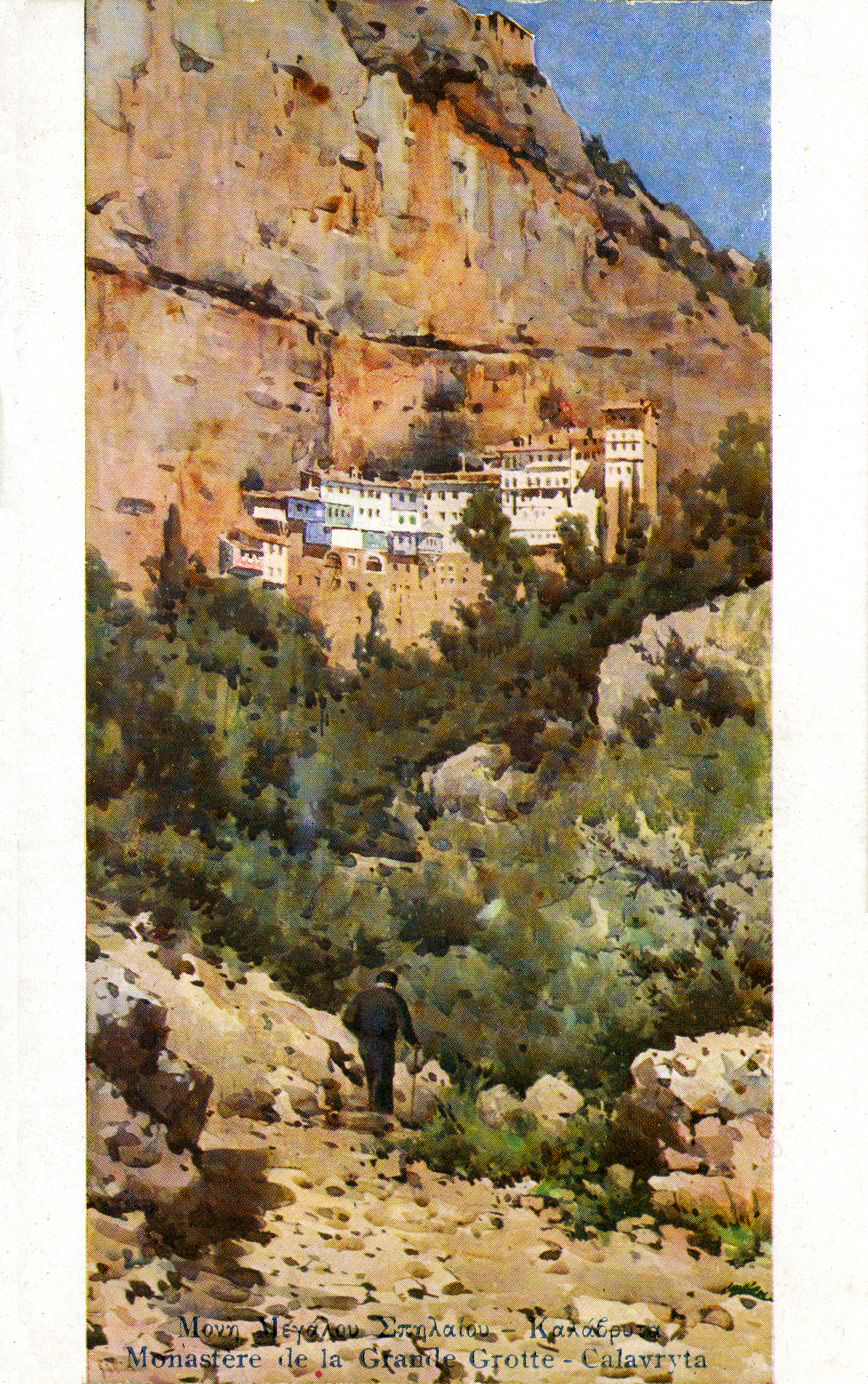
Aspiotis No. 168

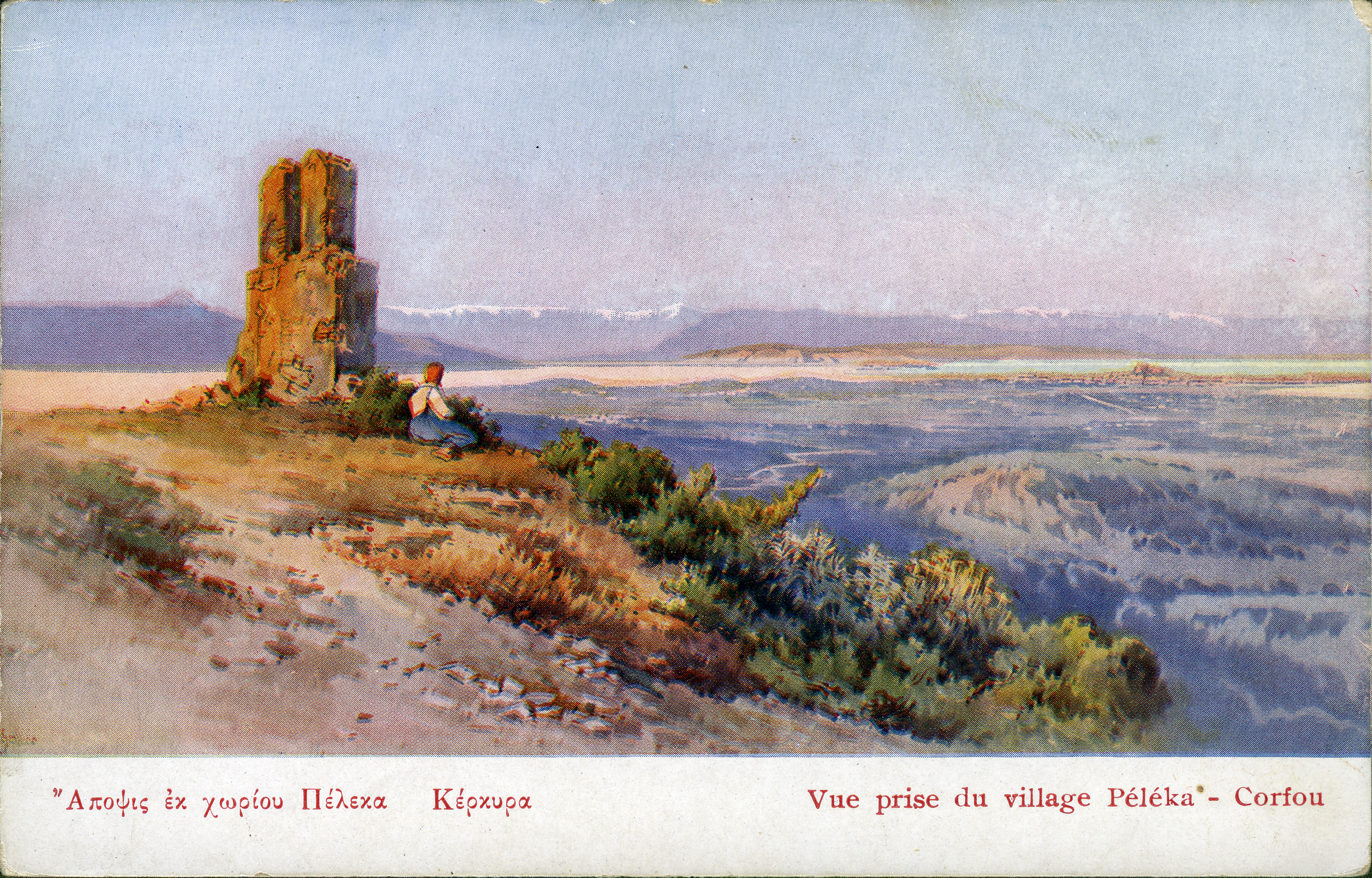
Aspiotis No. 169

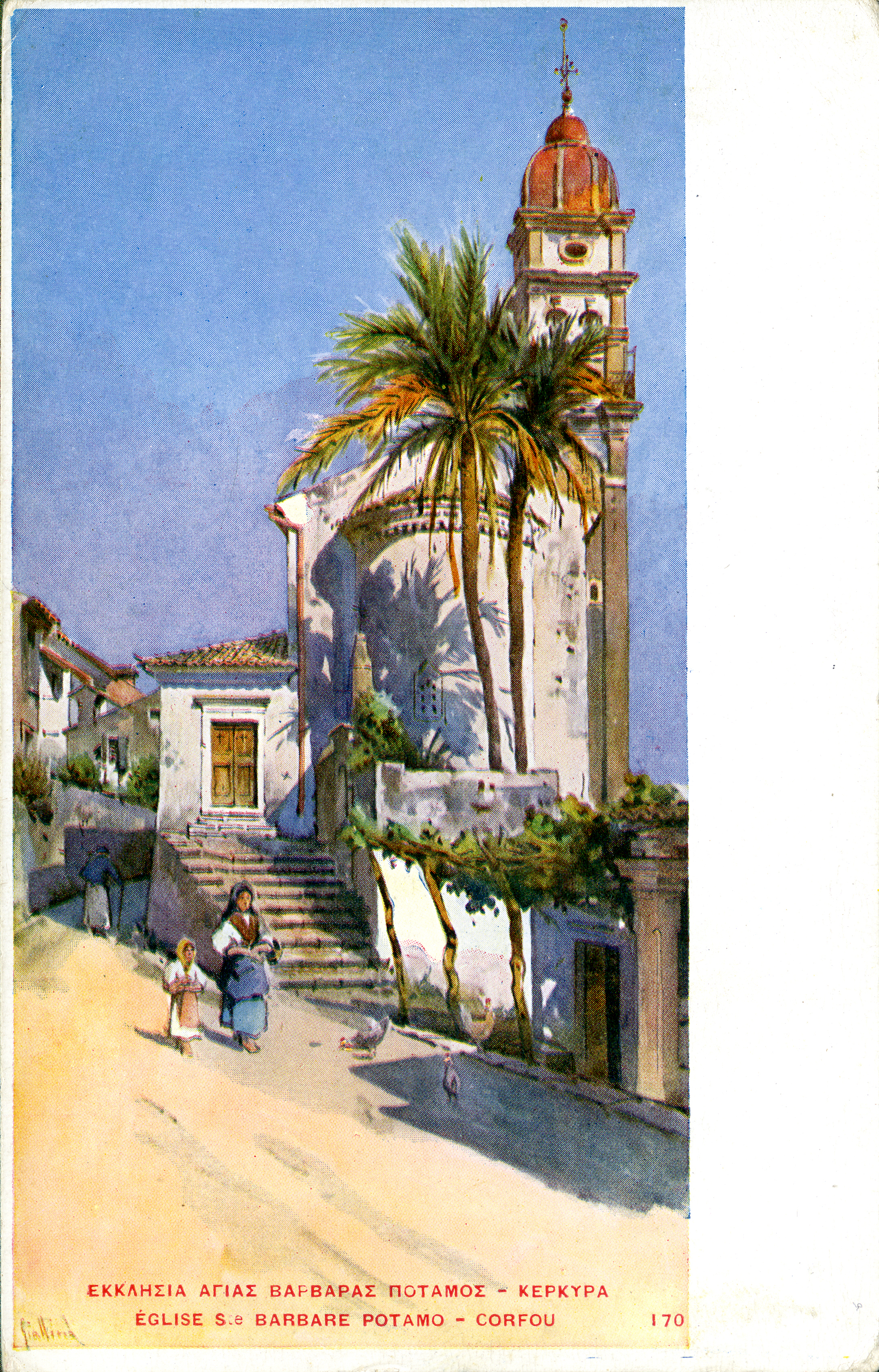
Aspiotis No. 170

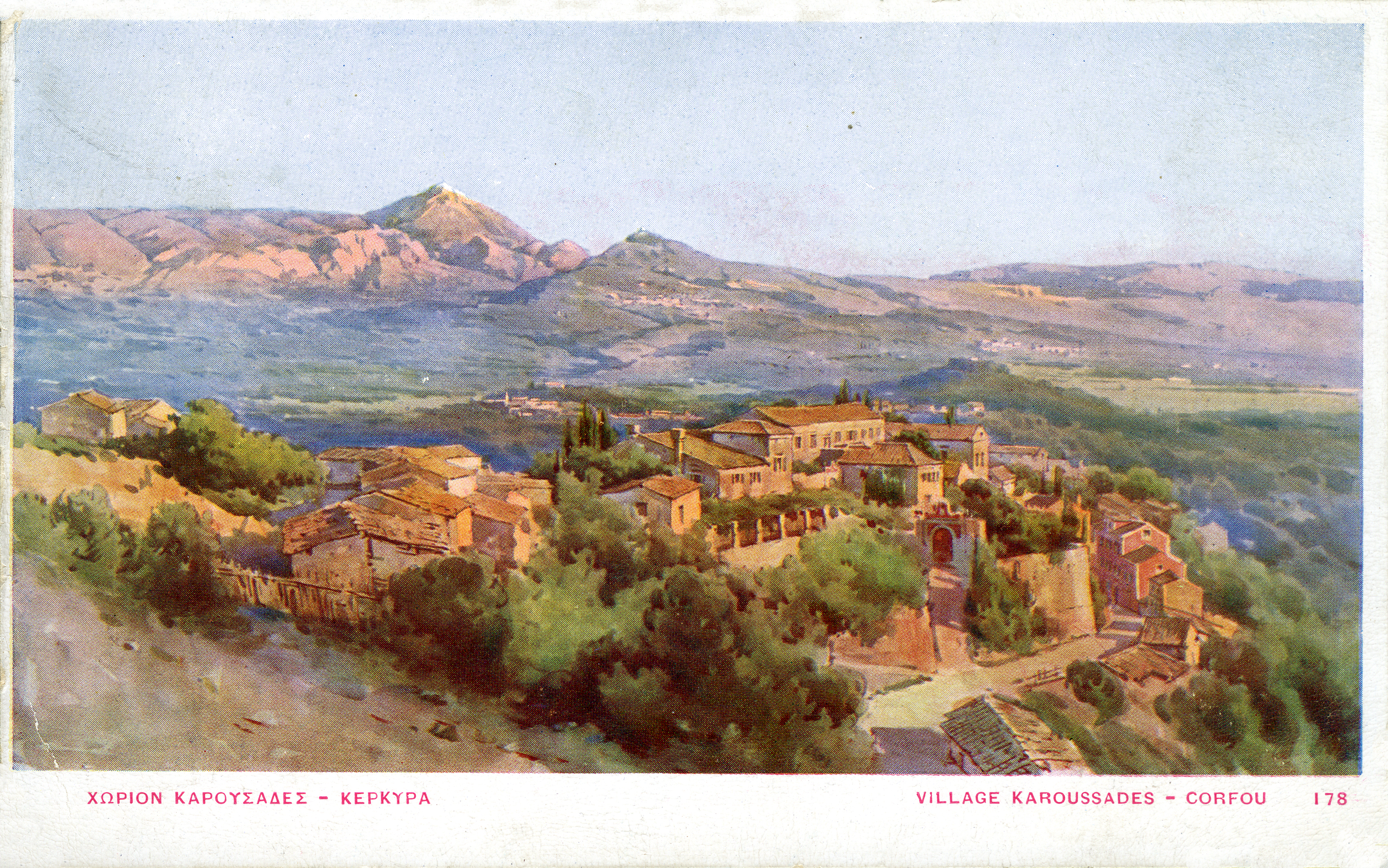
Aspiotis No. 178

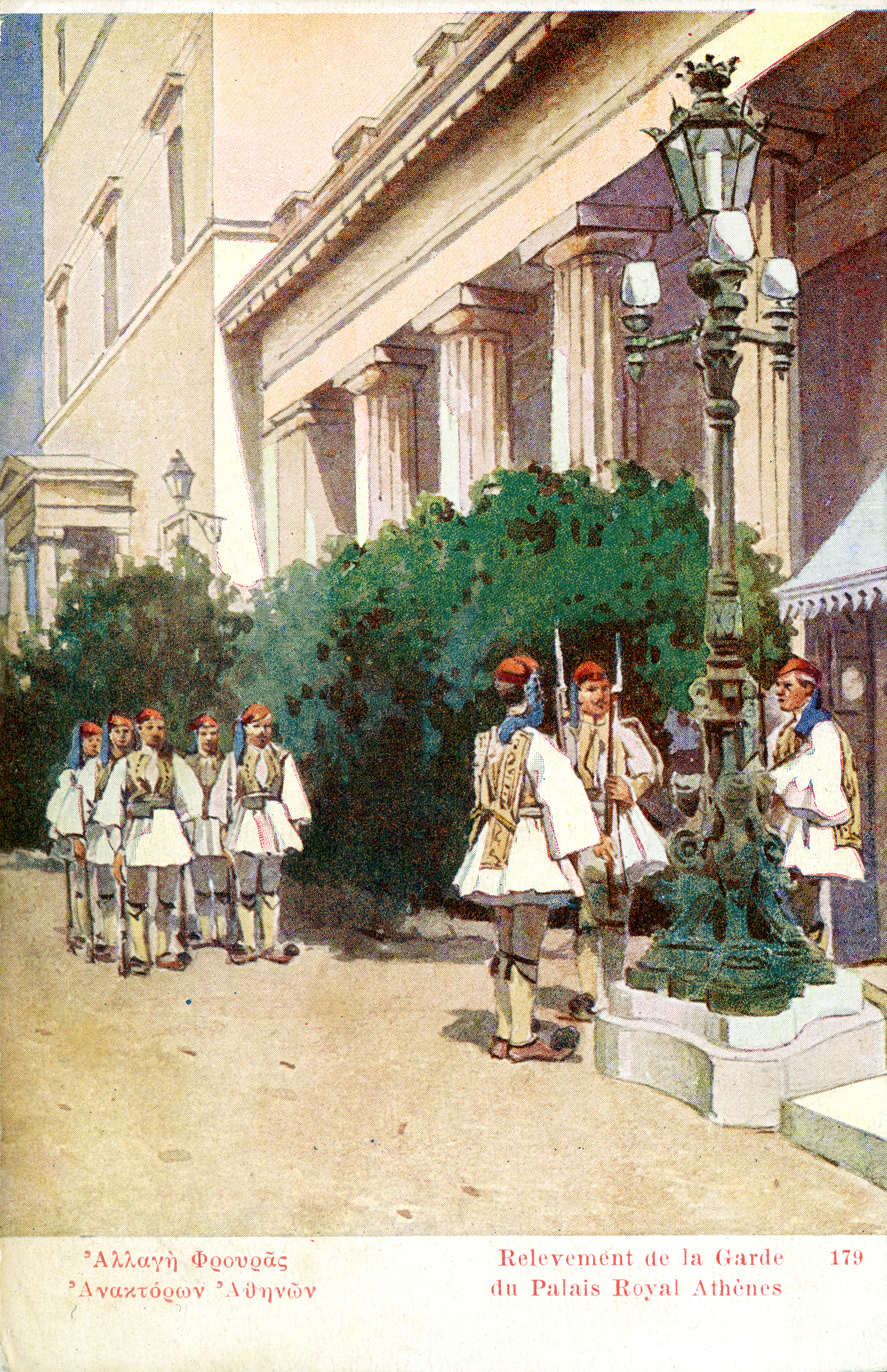
Aspiotis No. 179

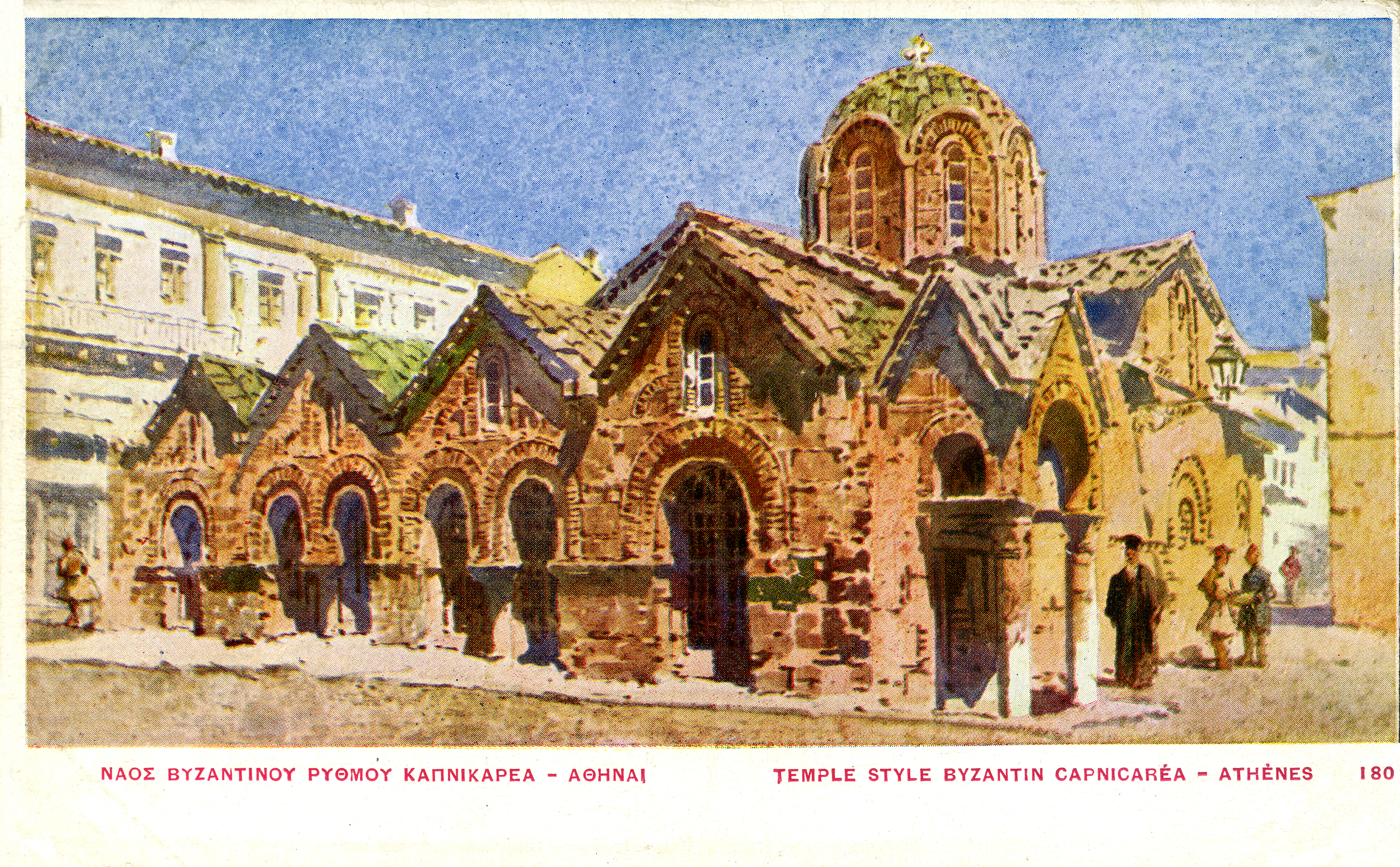
Aspiotis No. 180

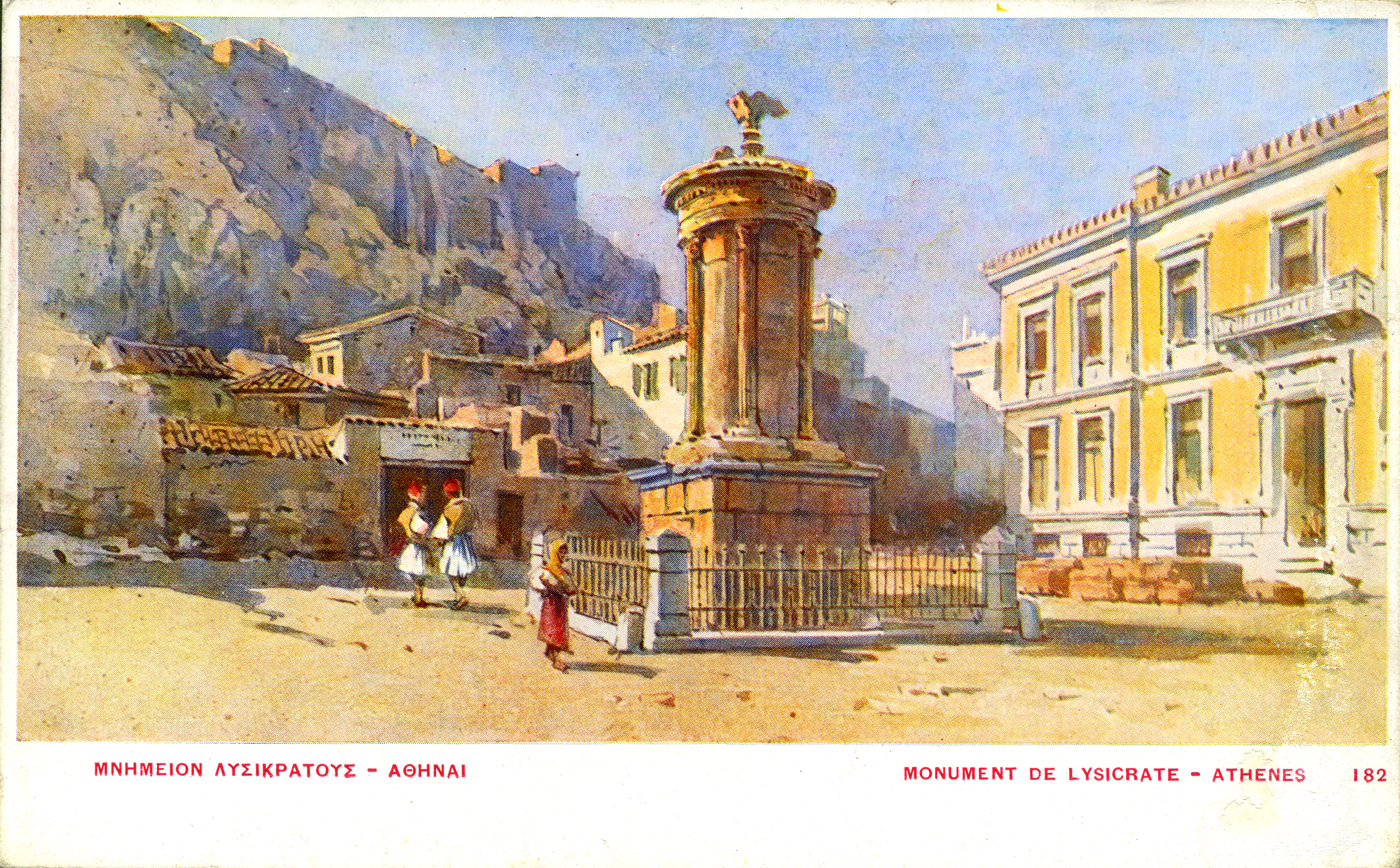
Aspiotis No. 182

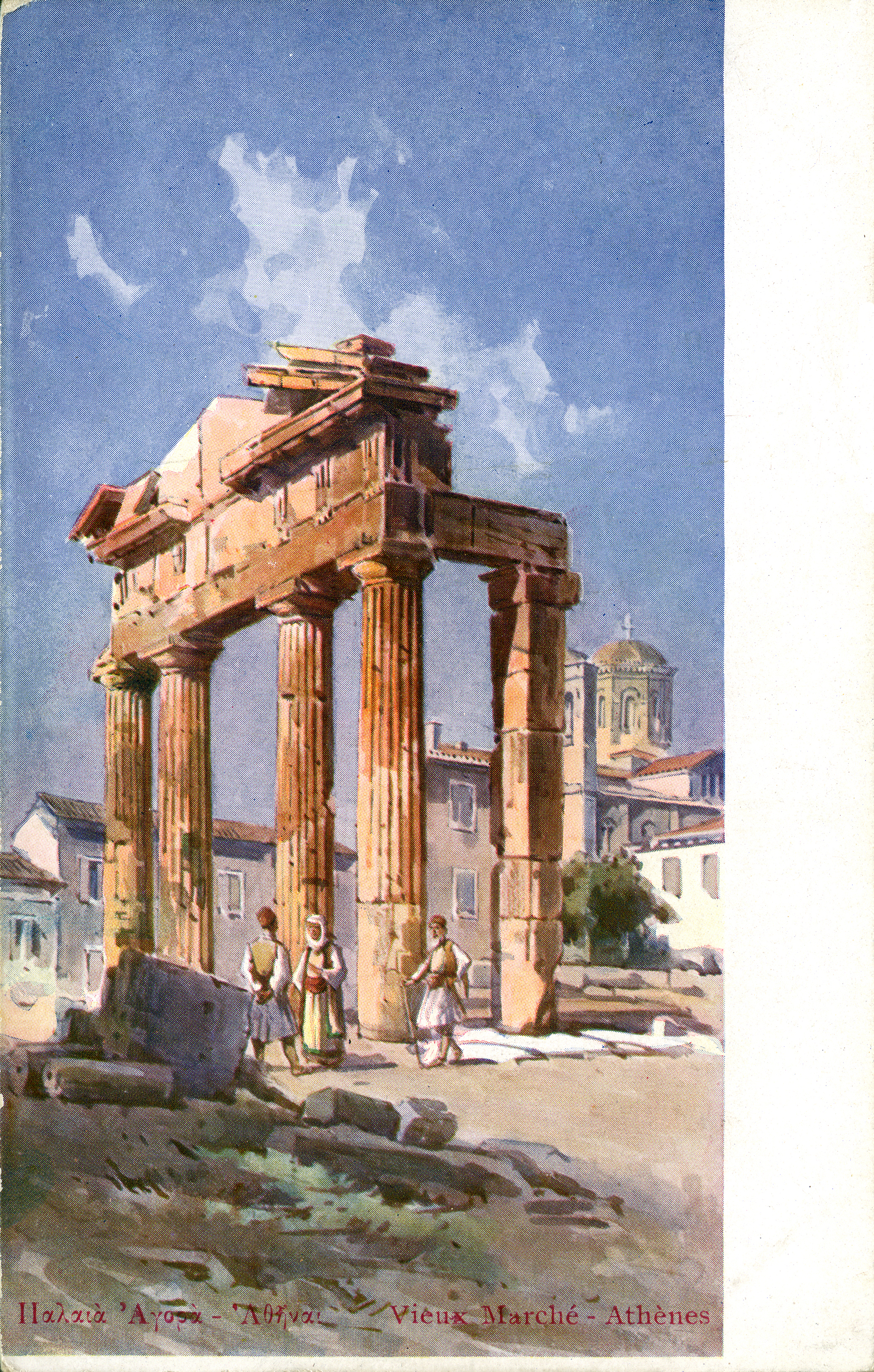
Aspiotis No. 183

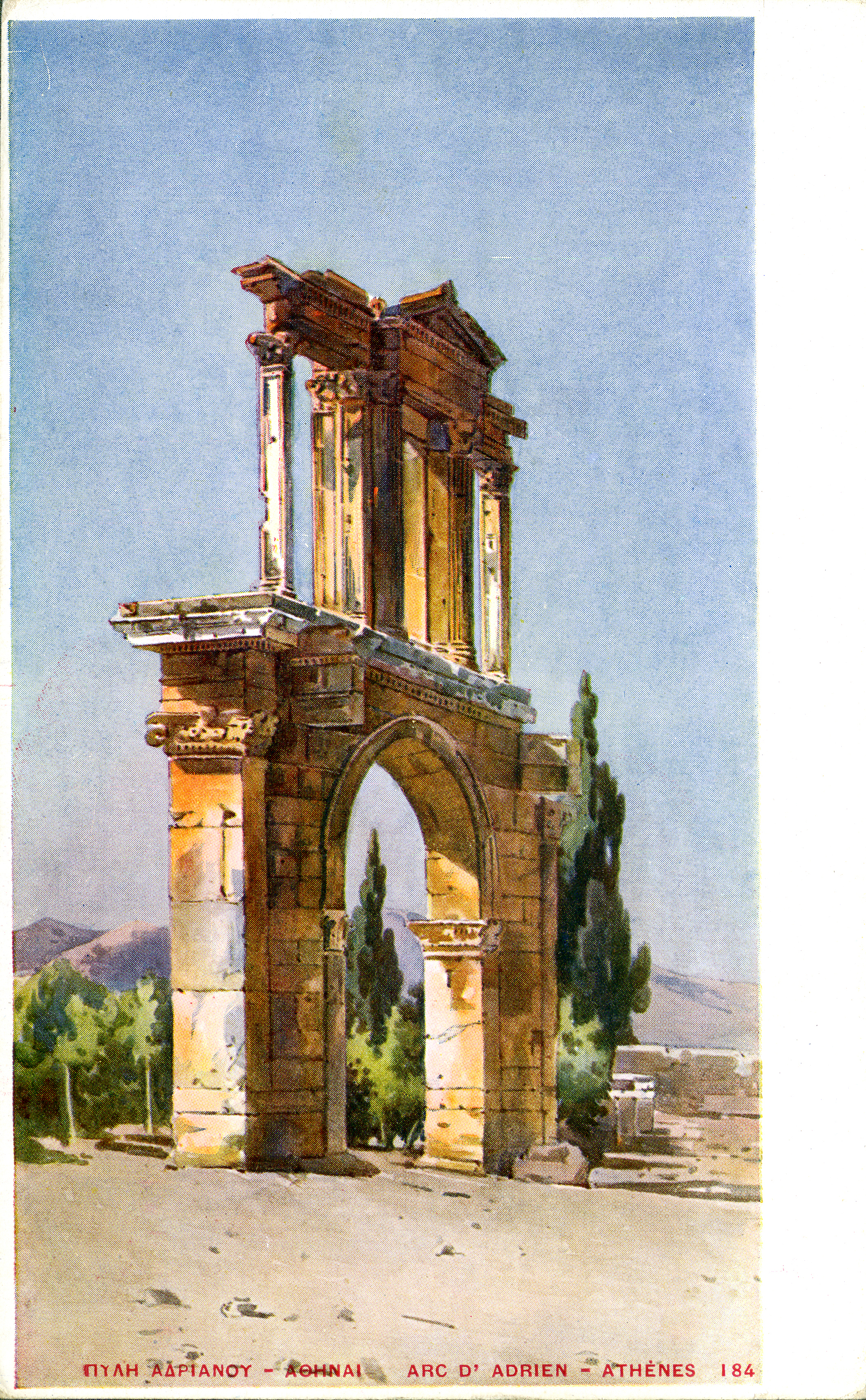
Aspiotis No. 184

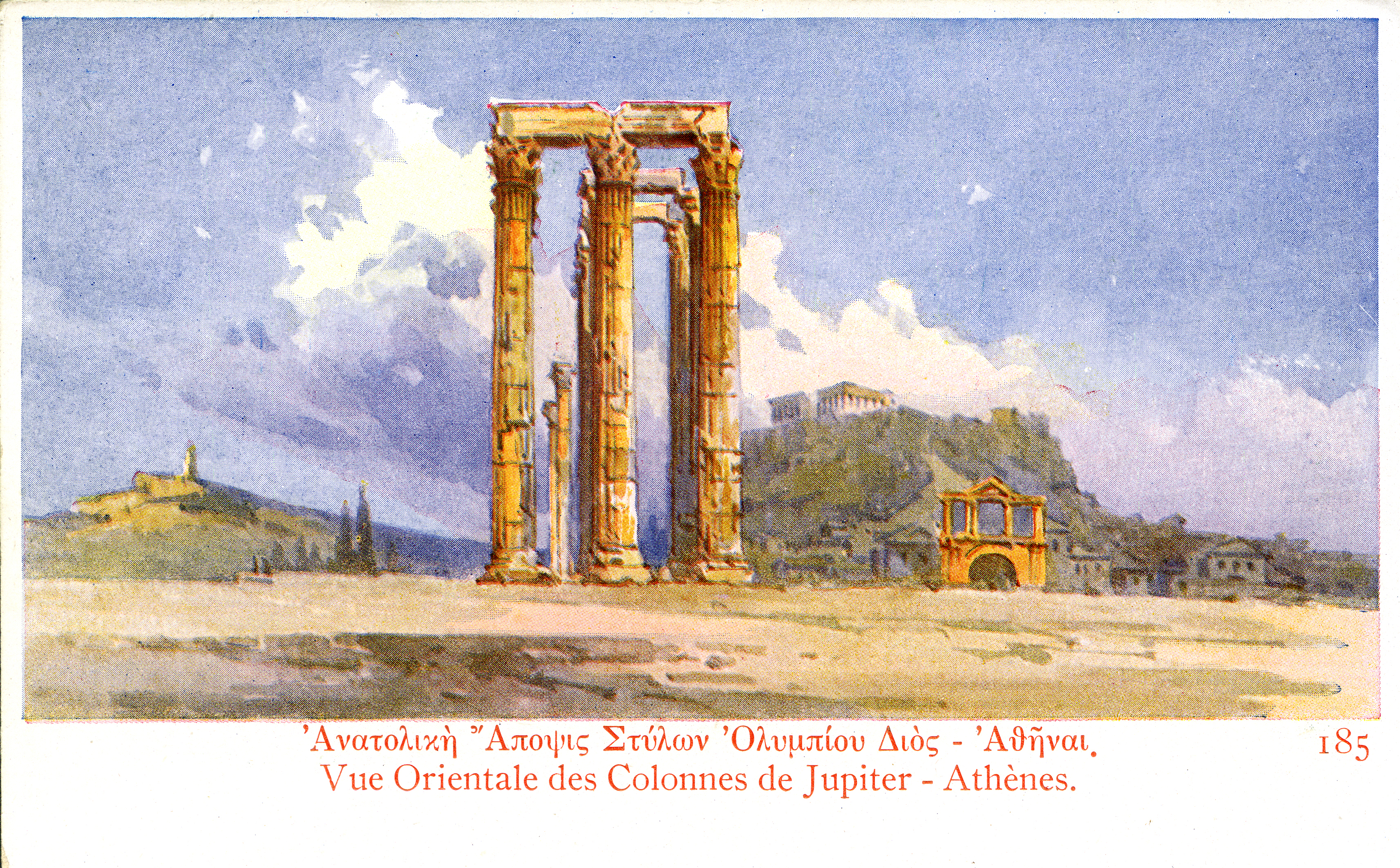
Aspiotis No. 185

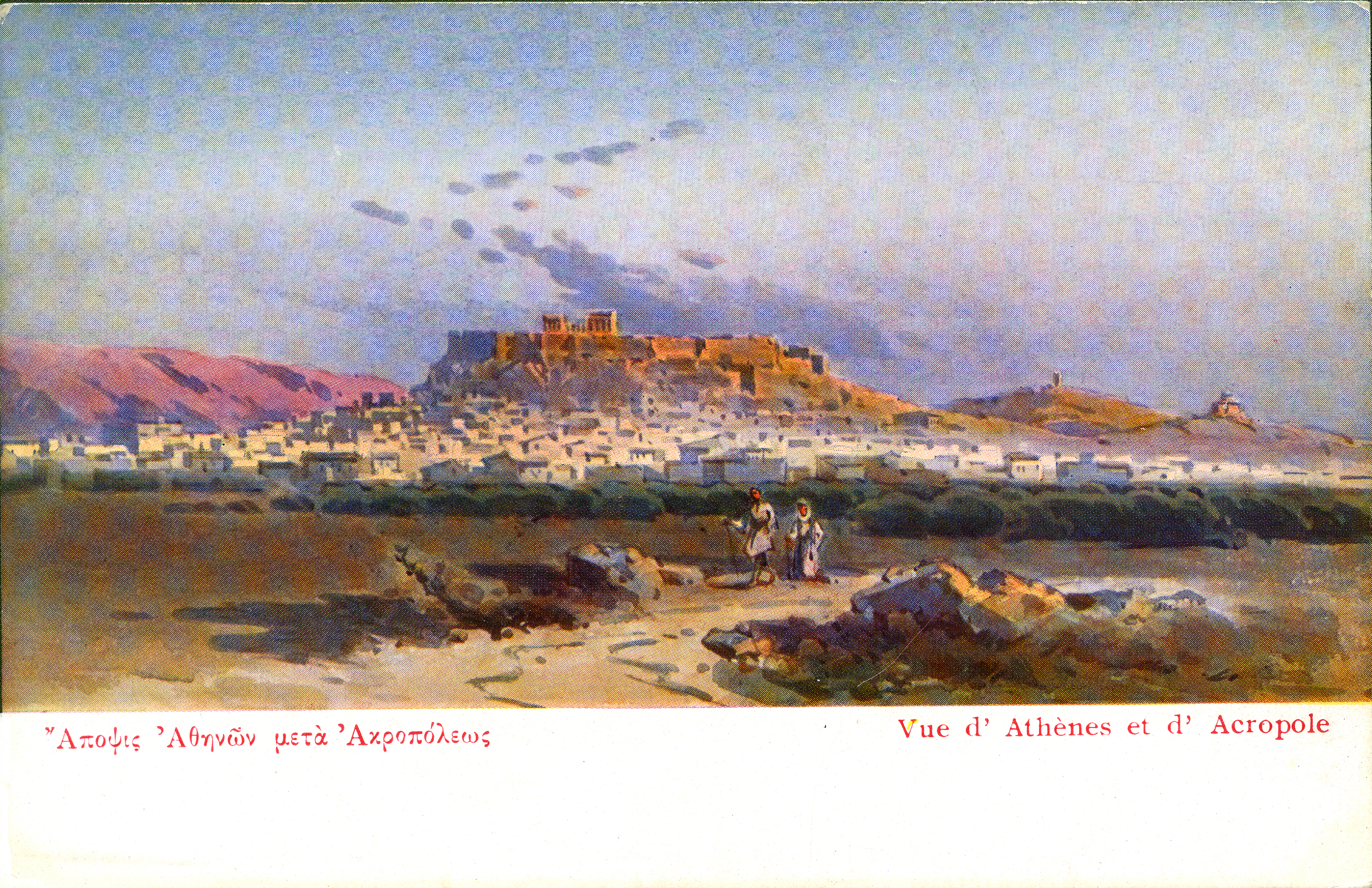
Aspiotis No. 186

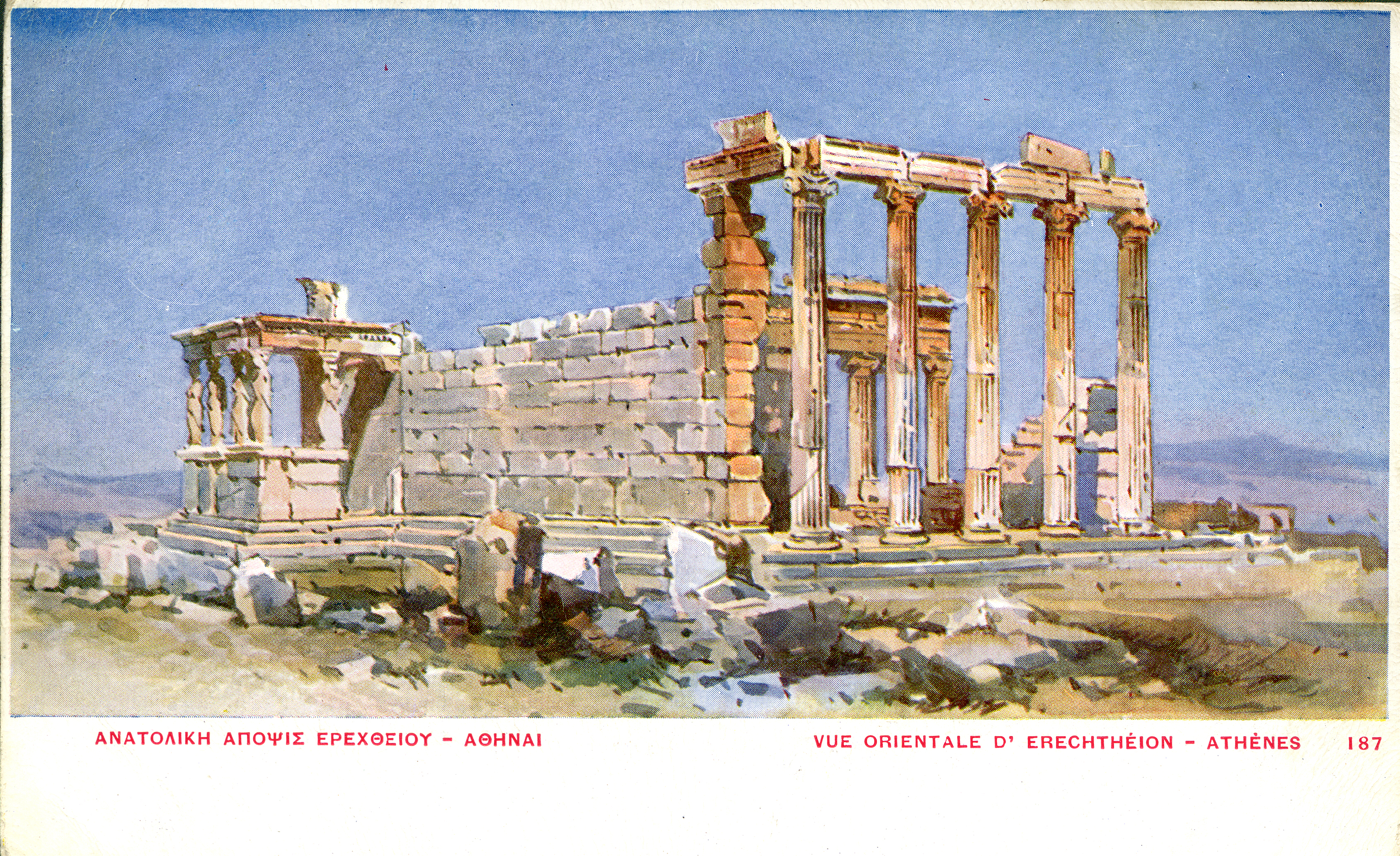
Aspiotis No. 187

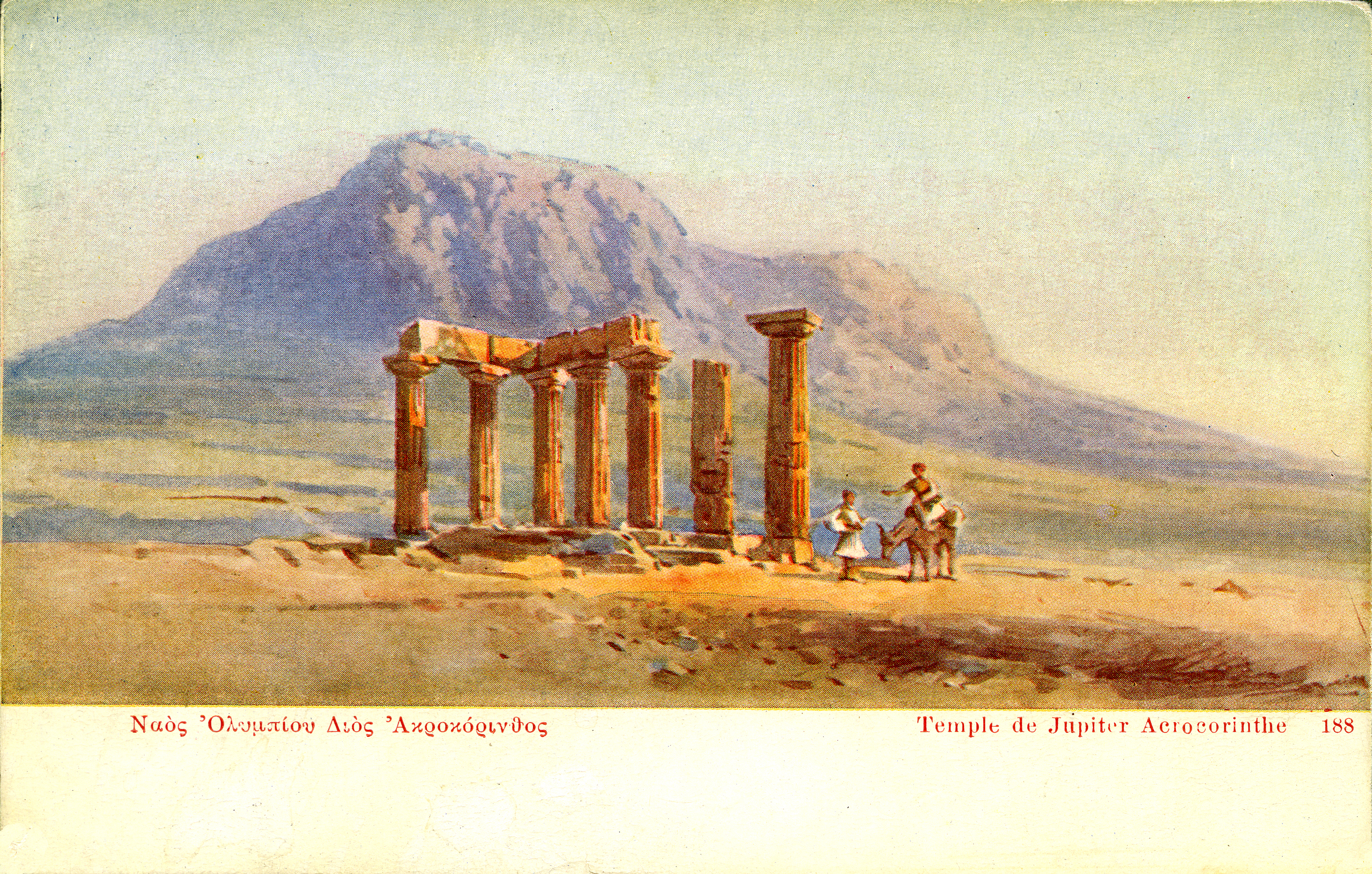
Aspiotis No. 188

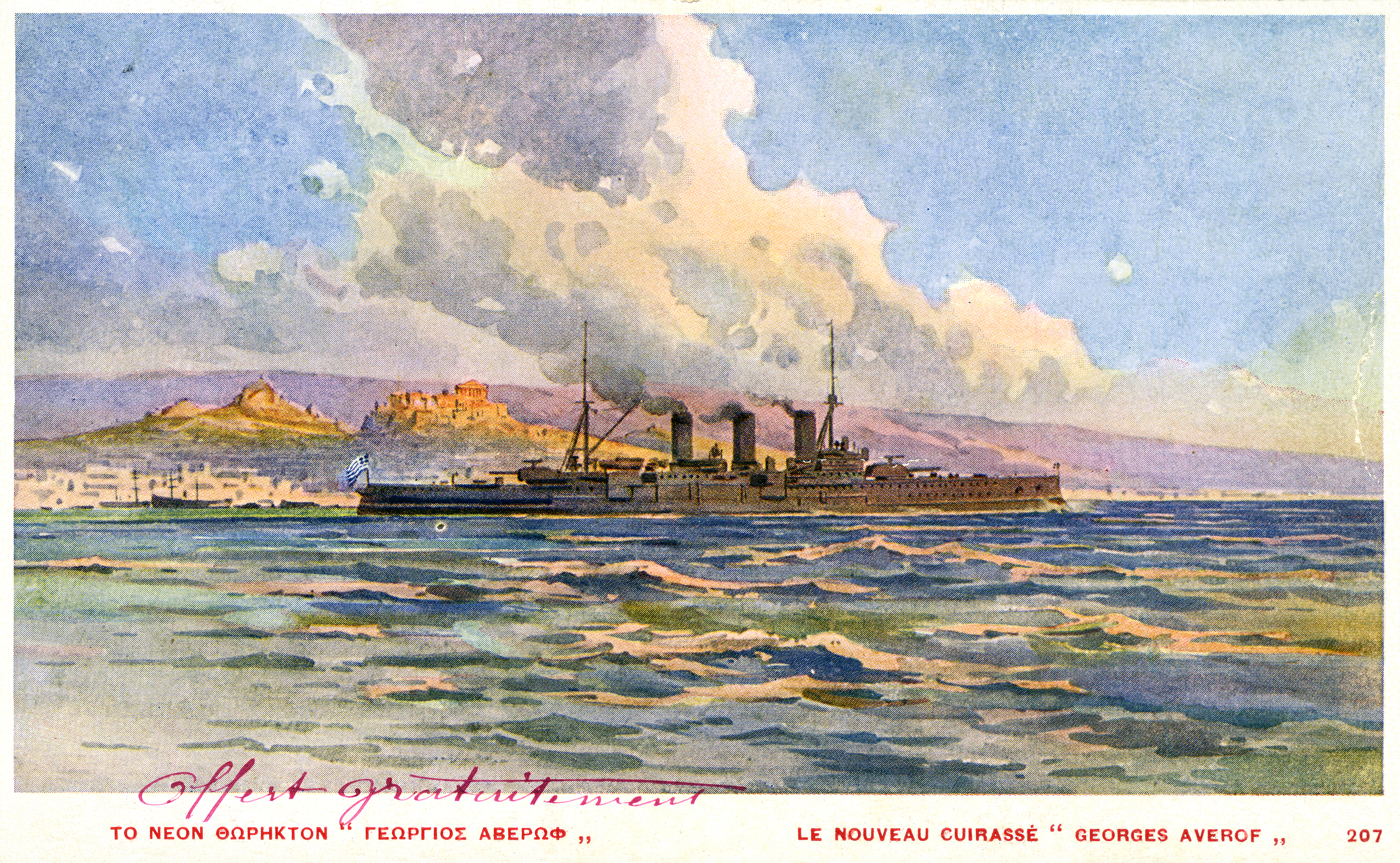
Aspiotis No. 207

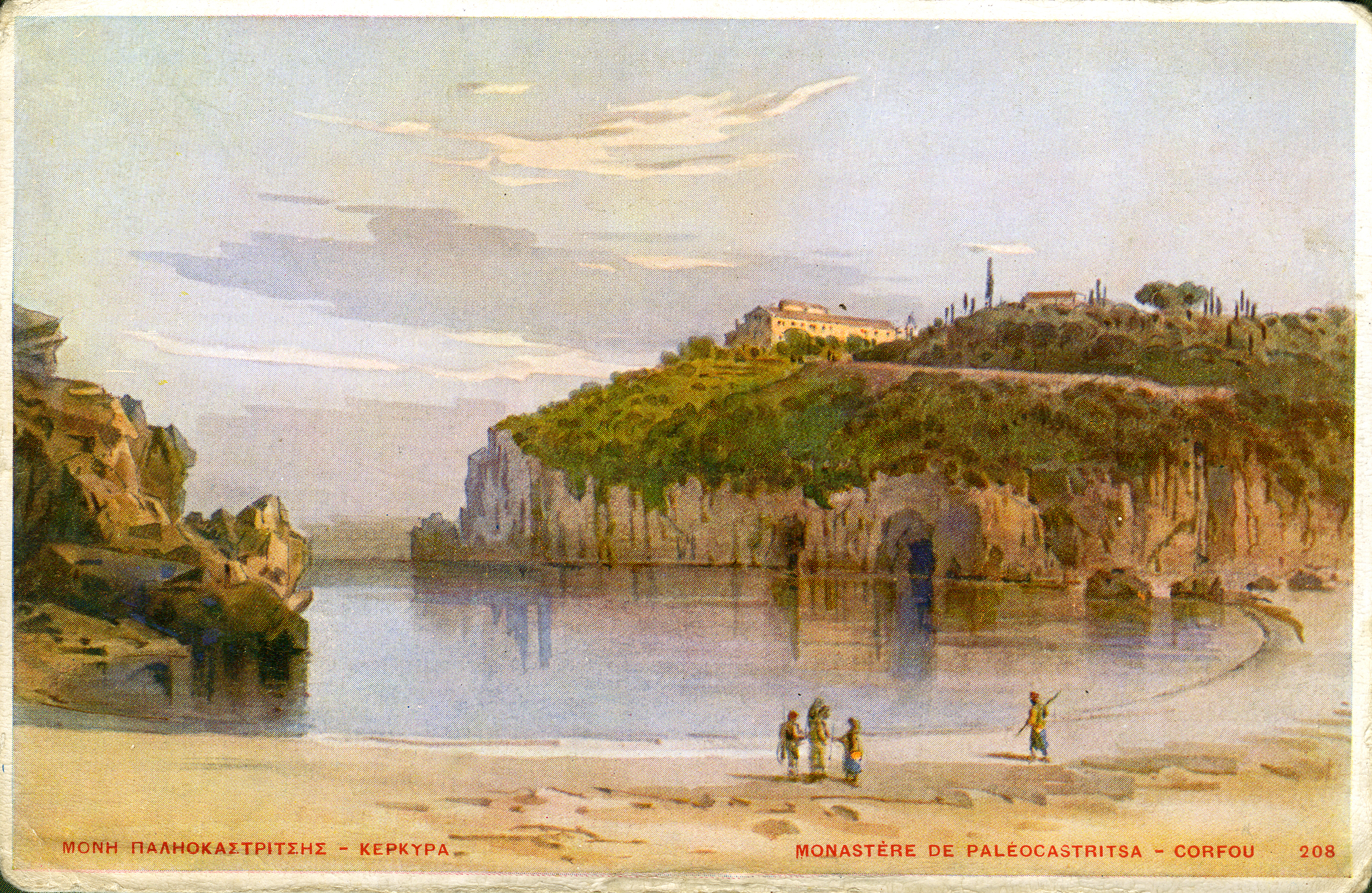
Aspiotis No. 208

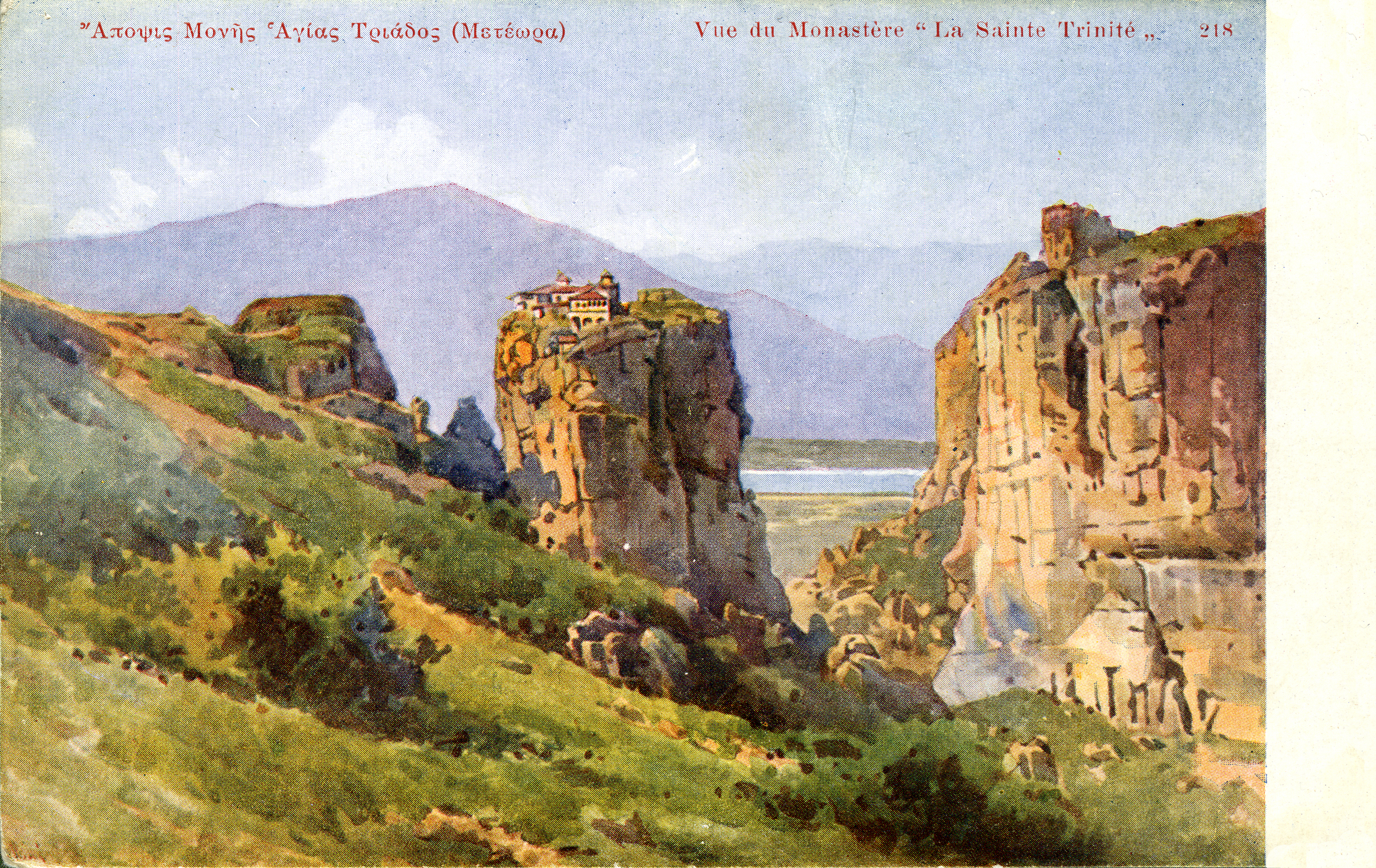
Aspiotis No. 218

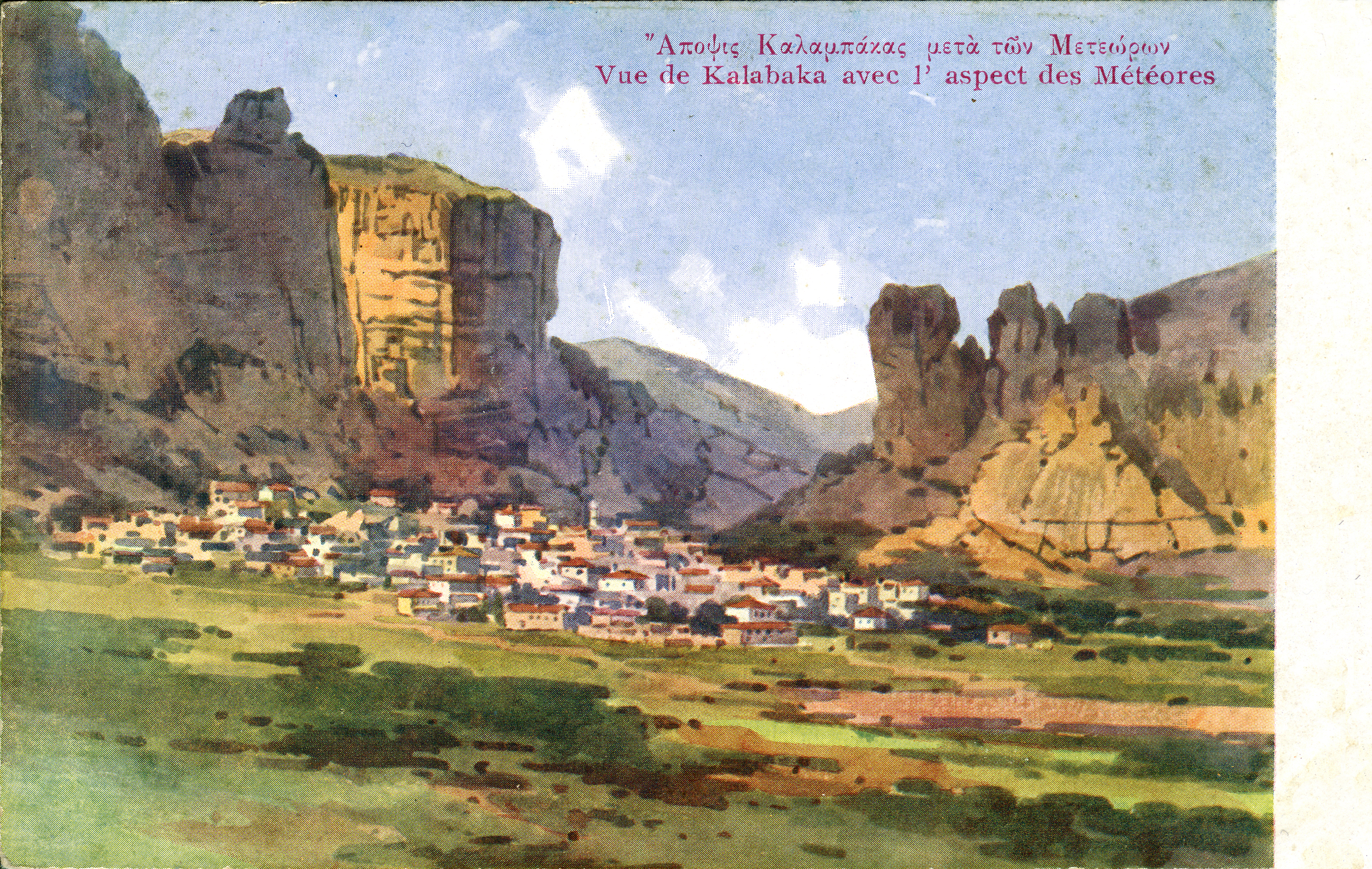
Aspiotis No. 219

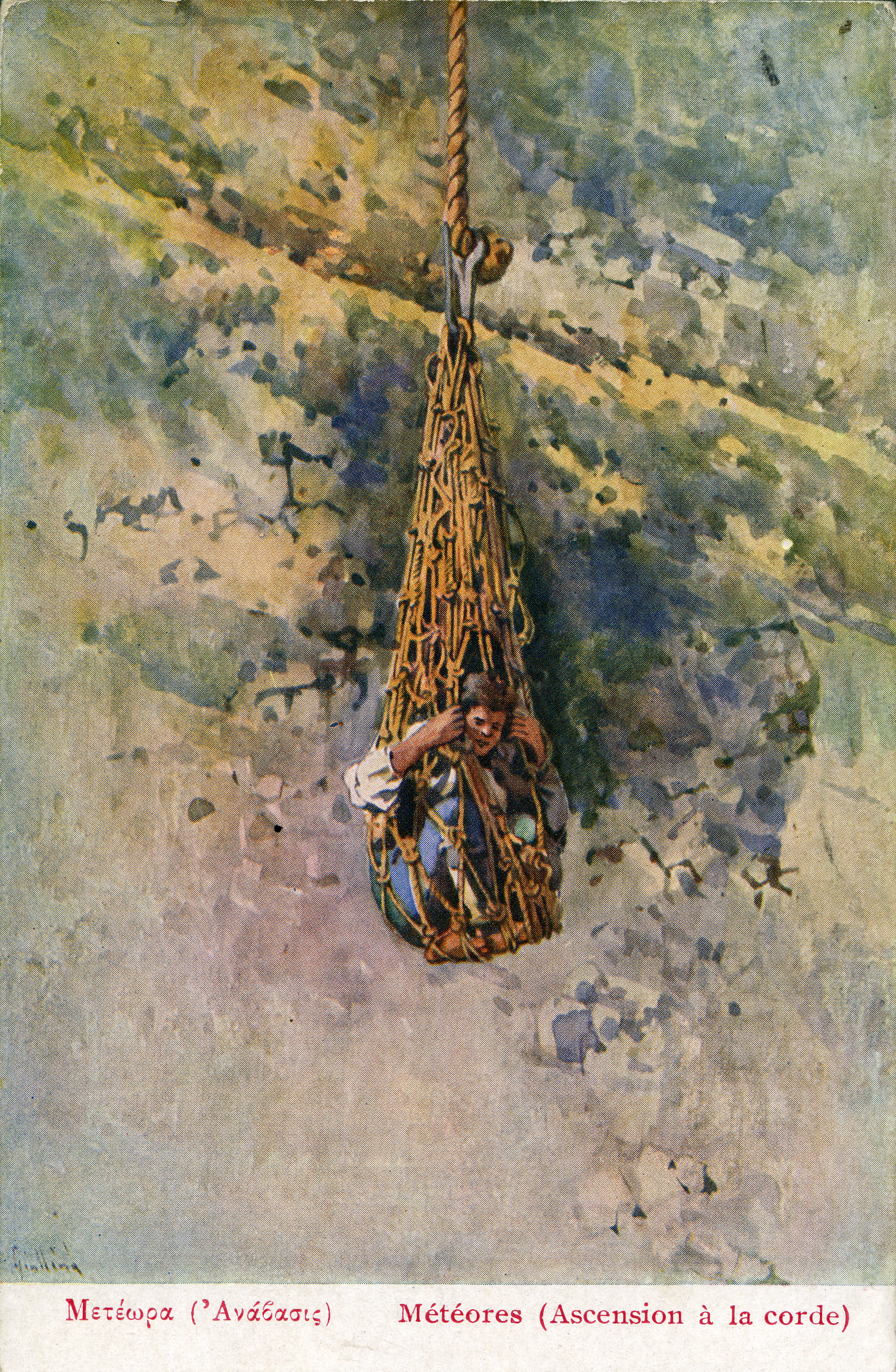
Aspiotis No. 220

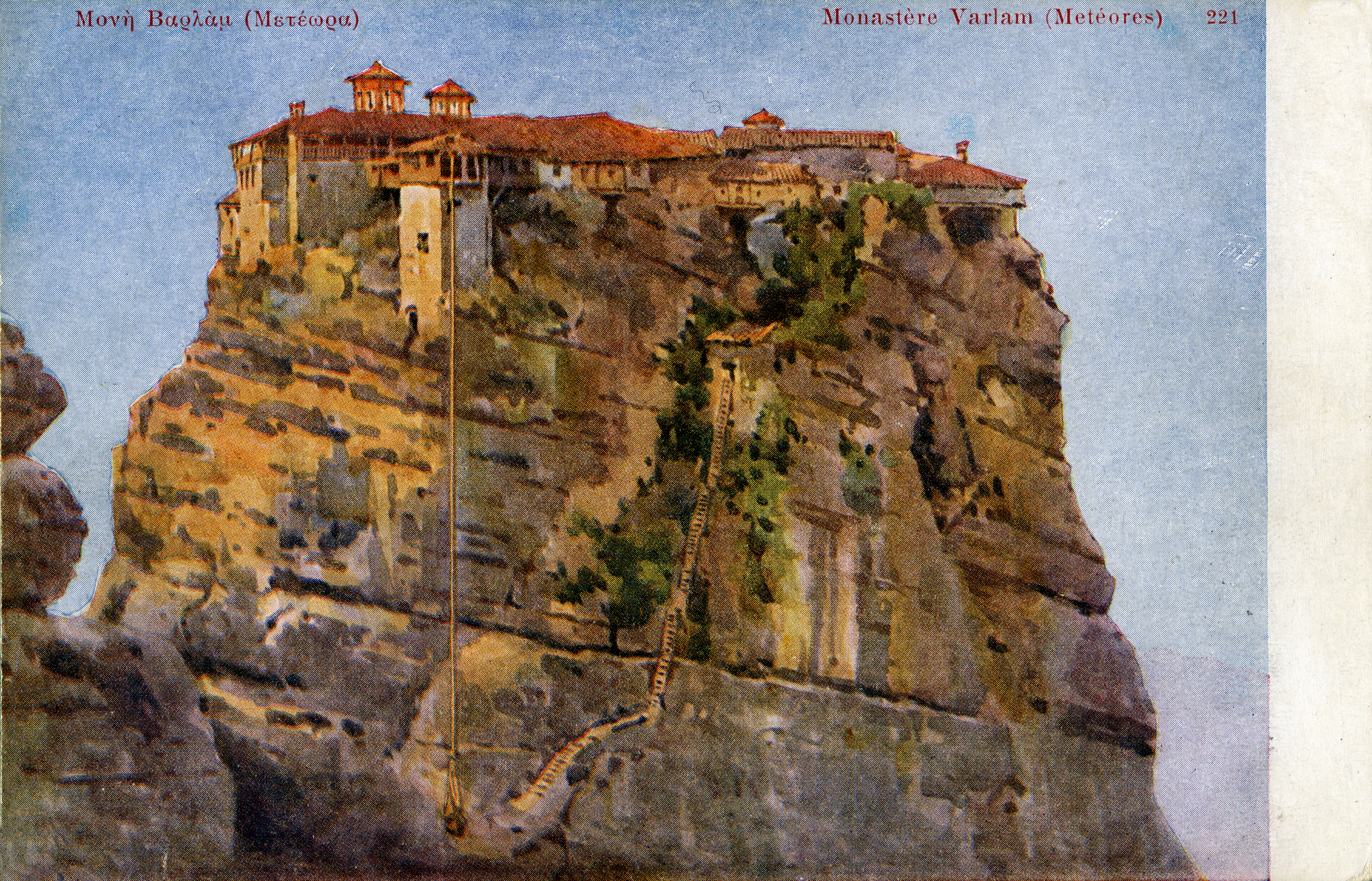
Aspiotis No. 221

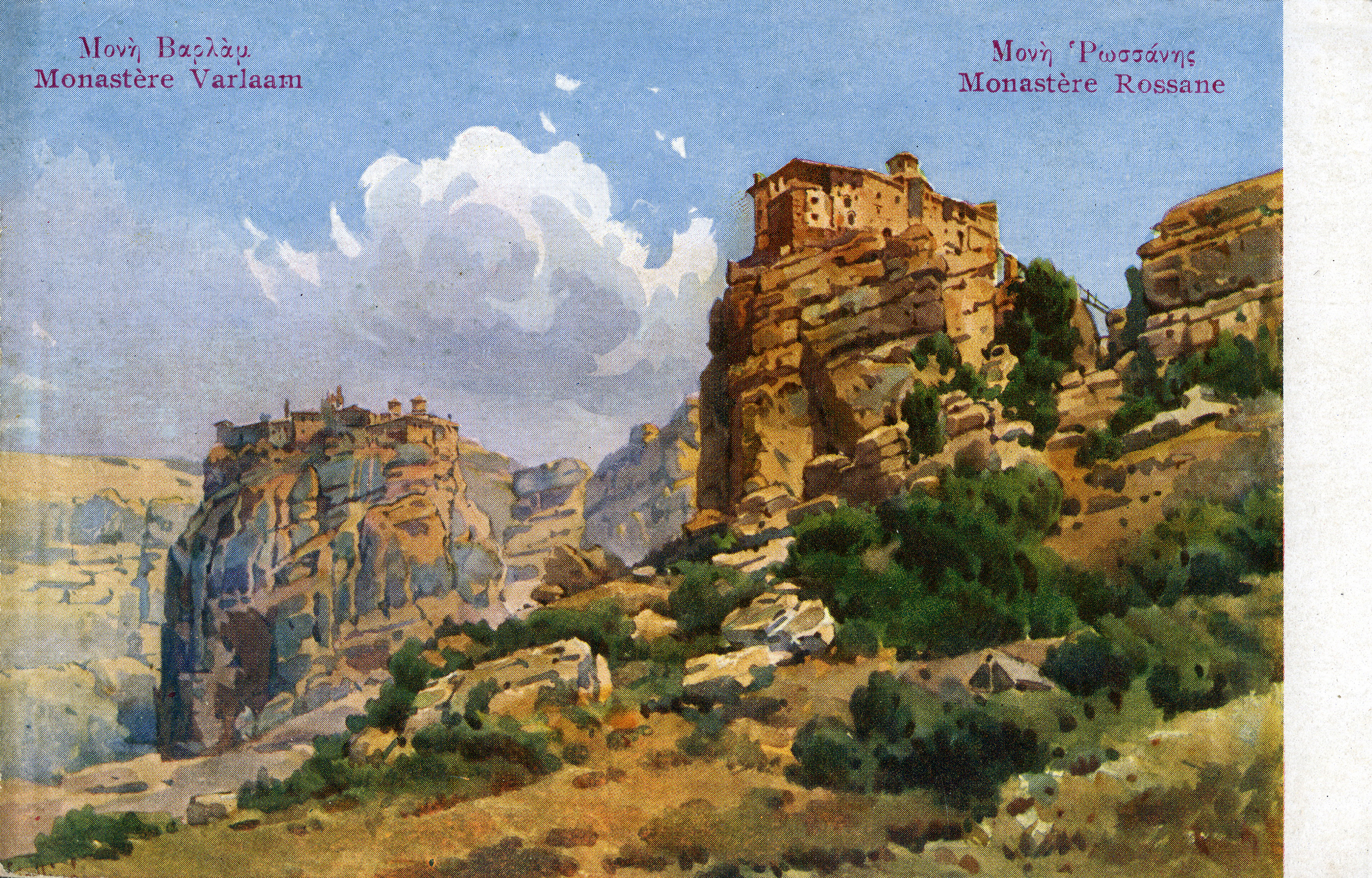
Aspiotis No. 222

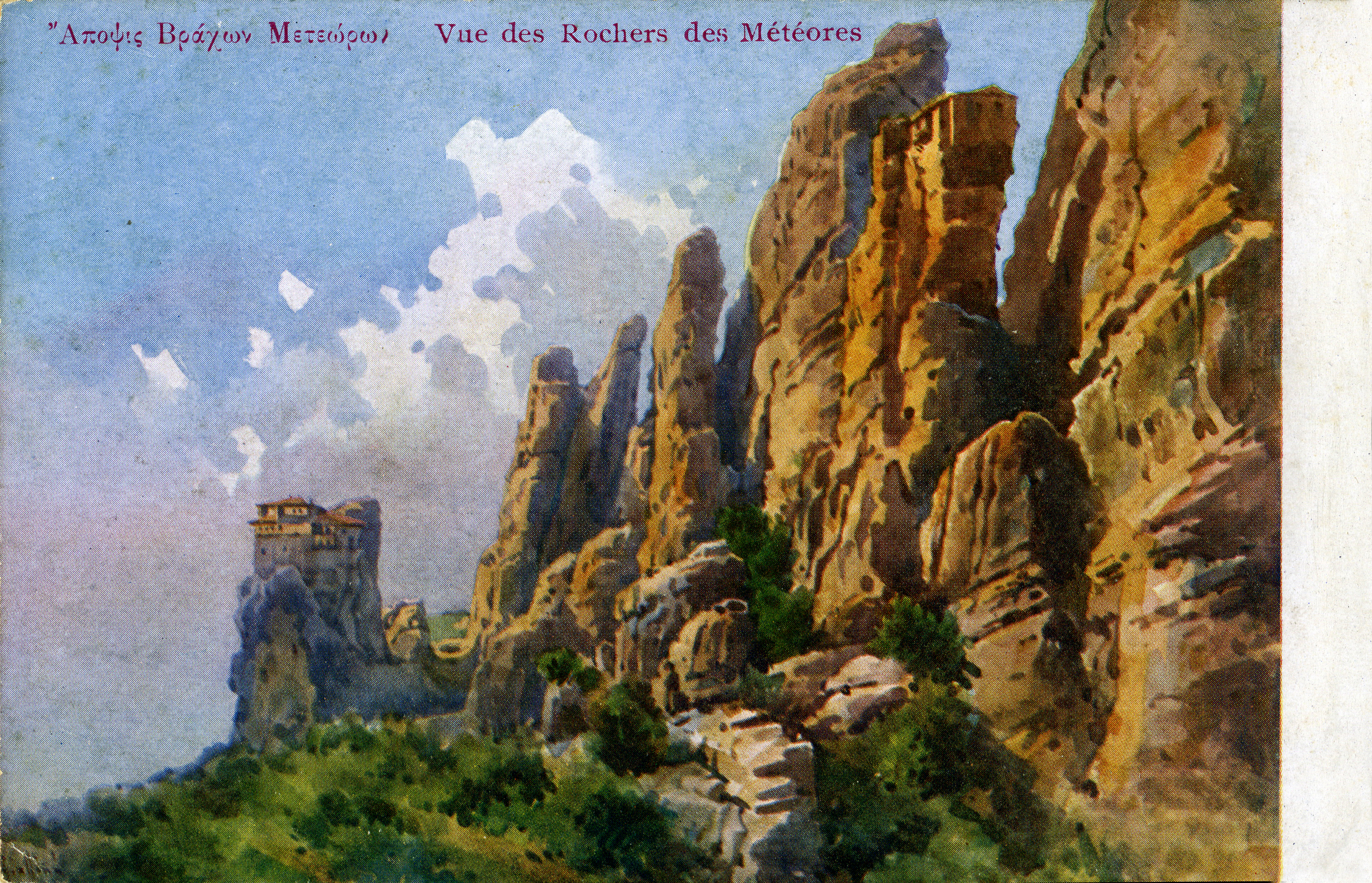
Aspiotis No. 223

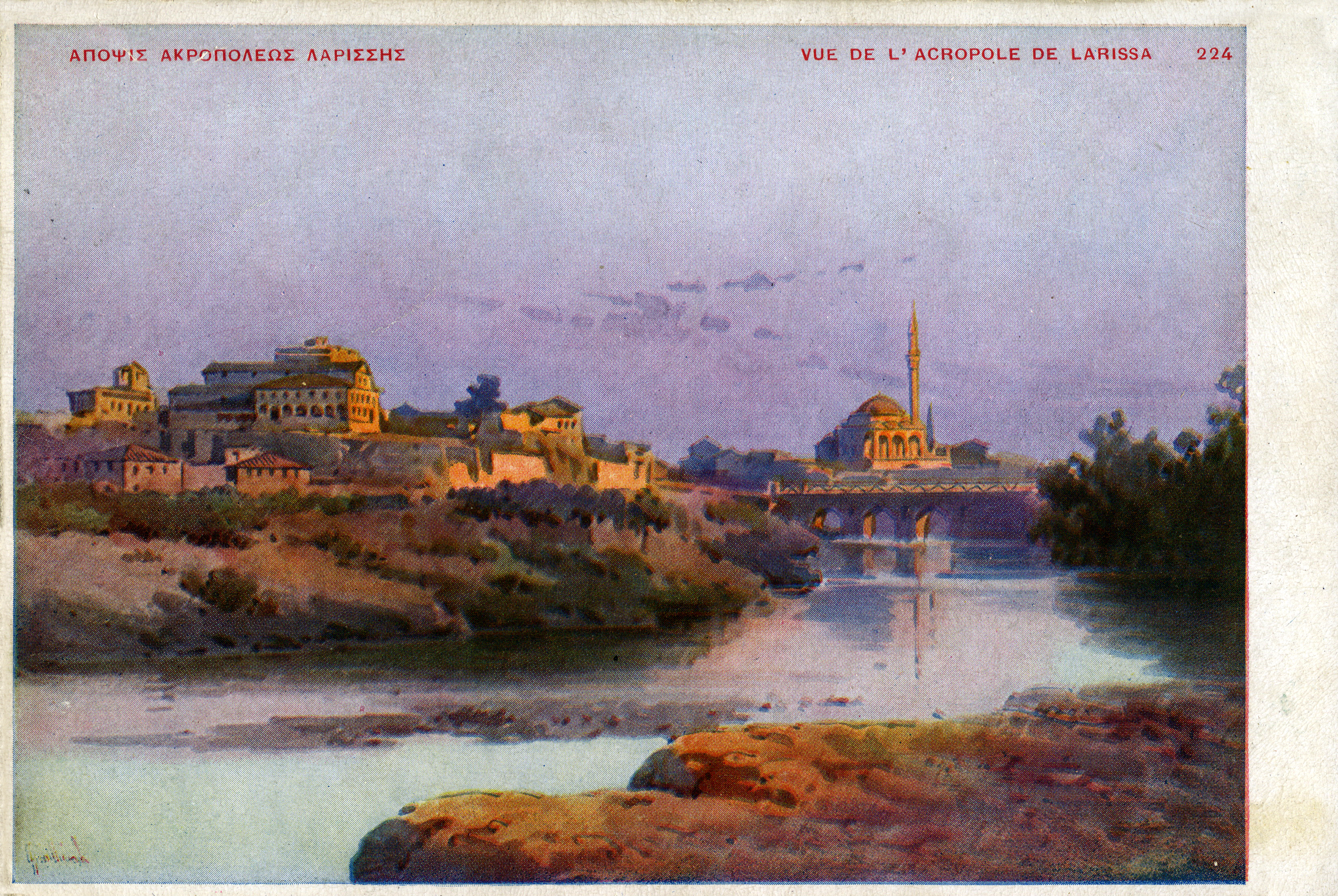
Aspiotis No. 224

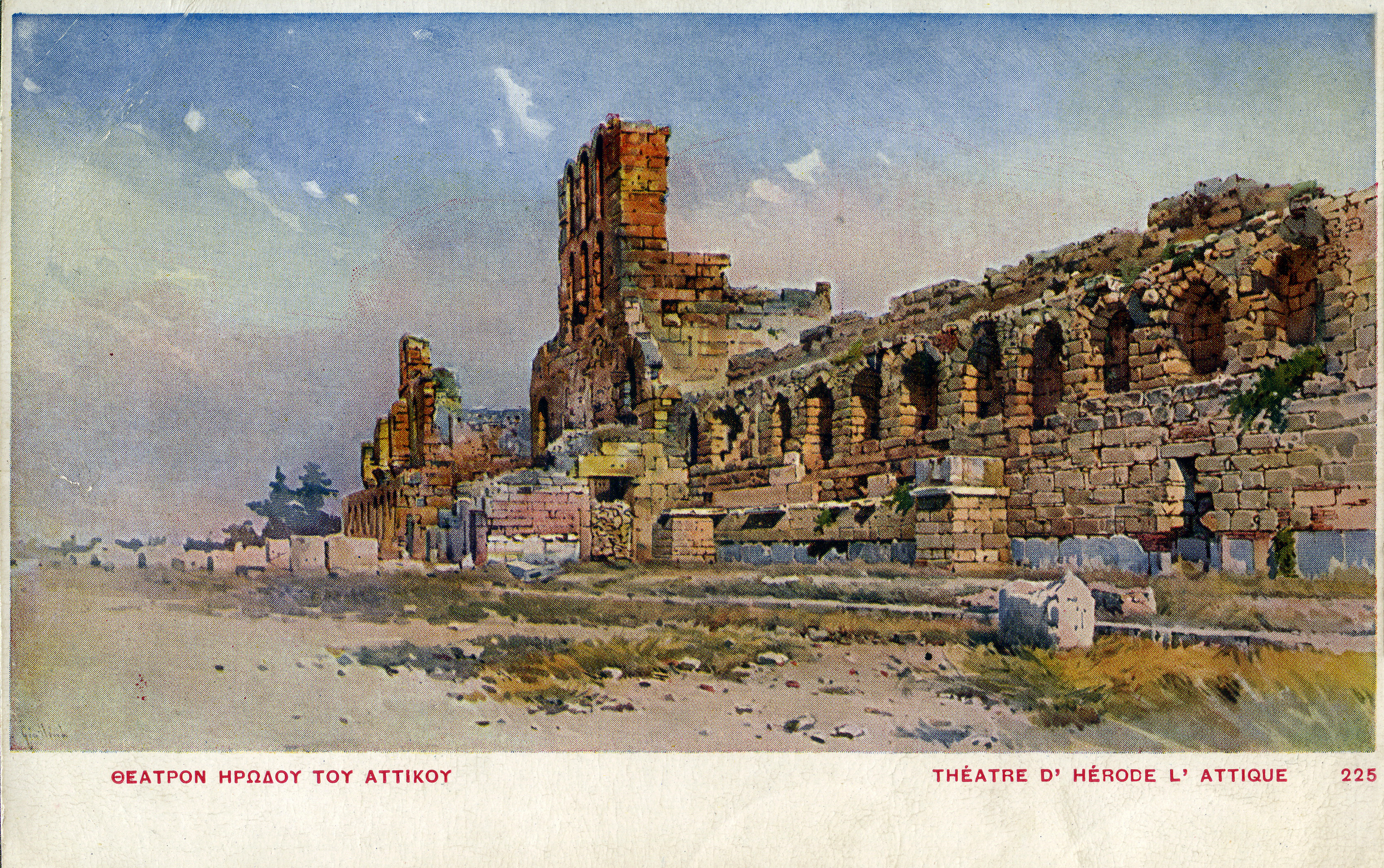
Aspiotis No. 225

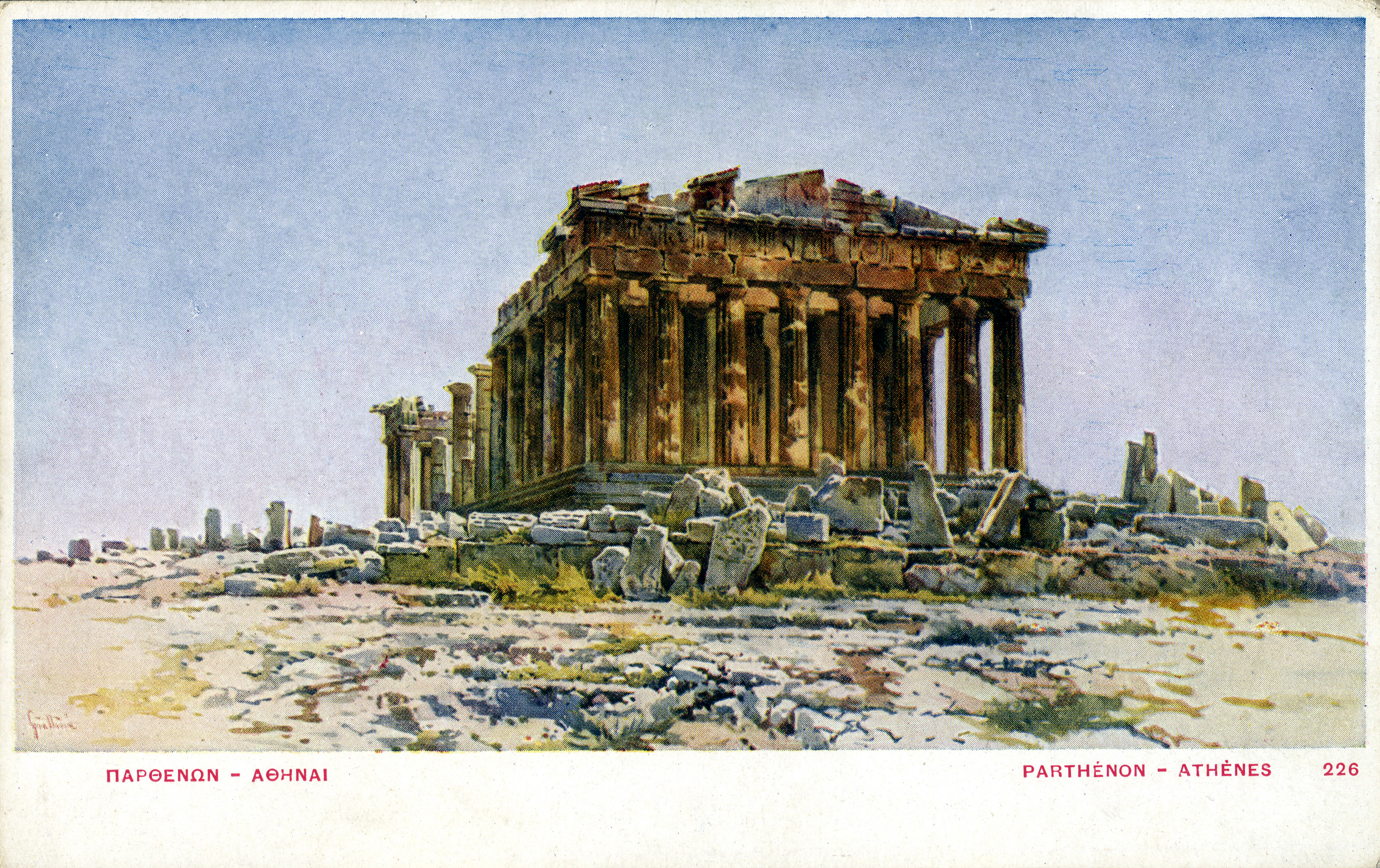
Aspiotis No. 226

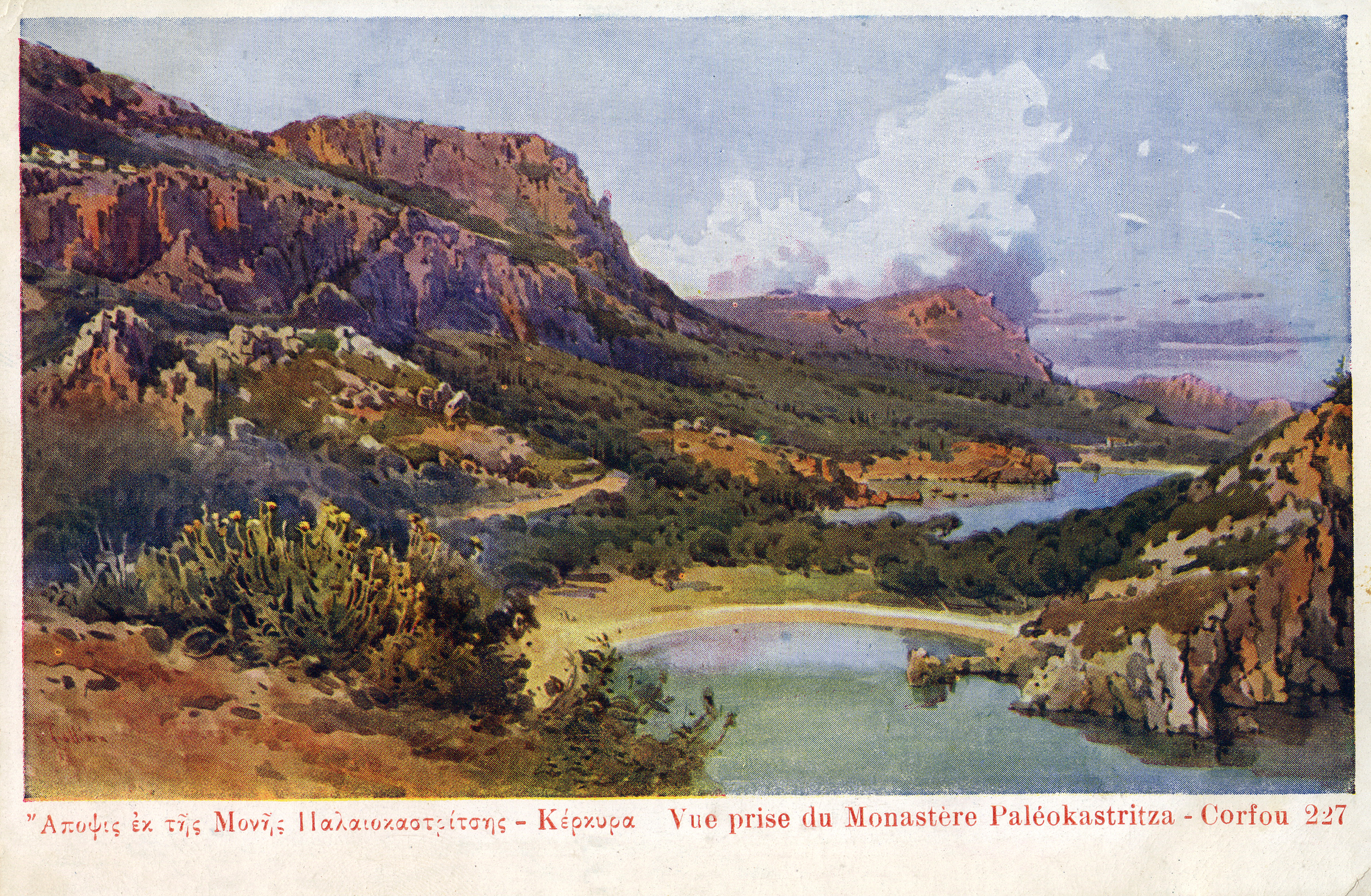
Aspiotis No. 227

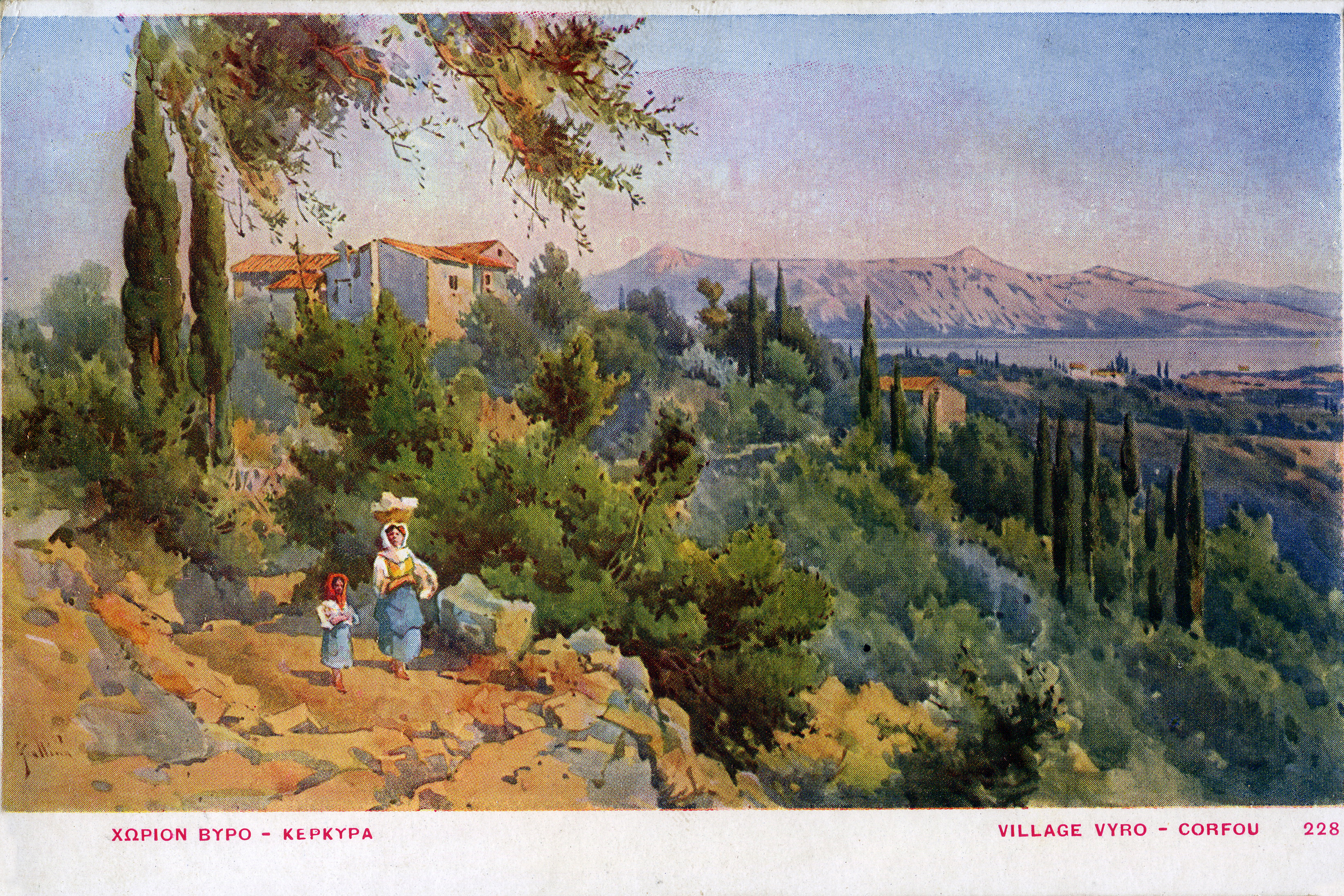
Aspiotis No. 228

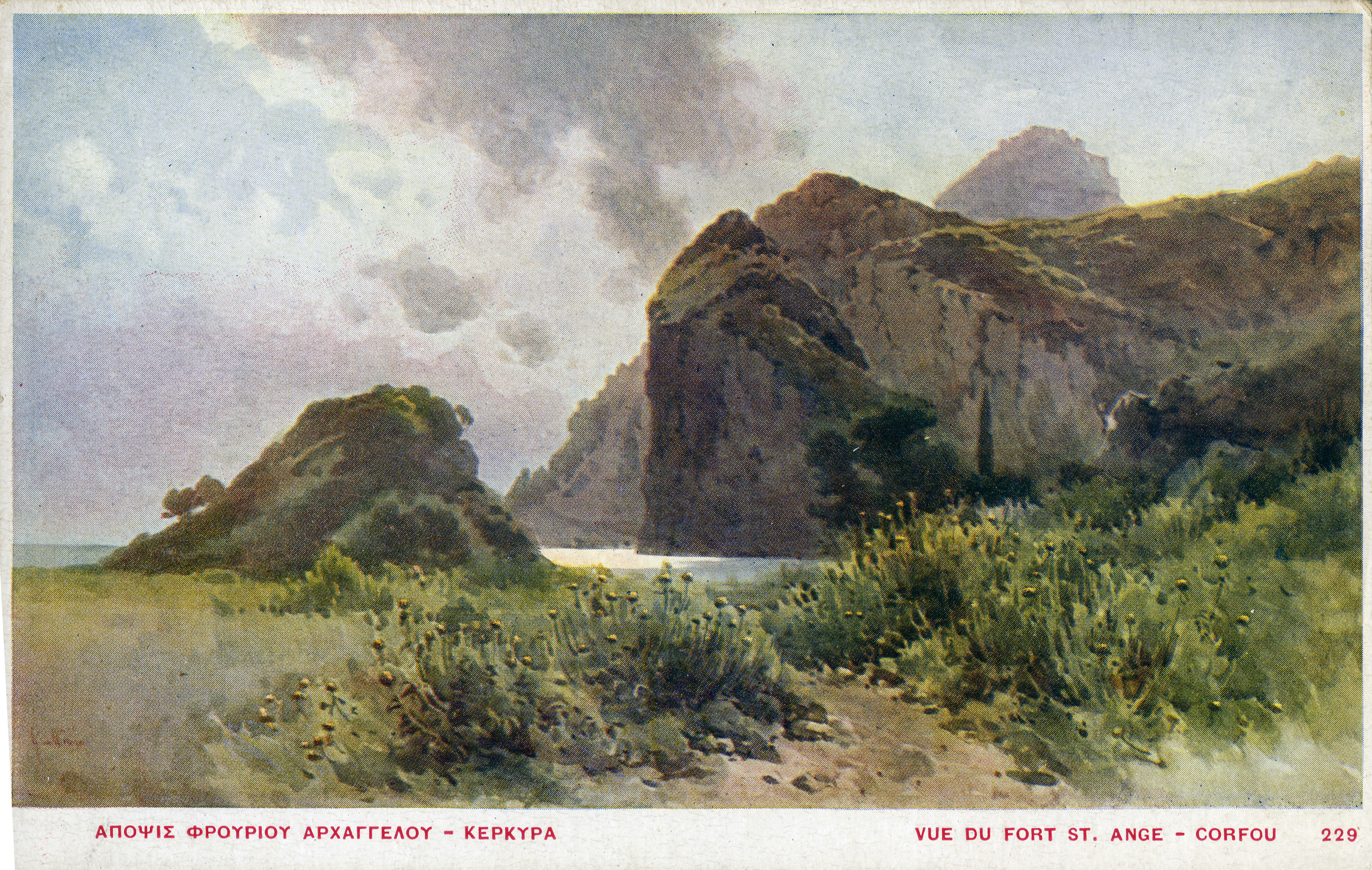
Aspiotis No. 229

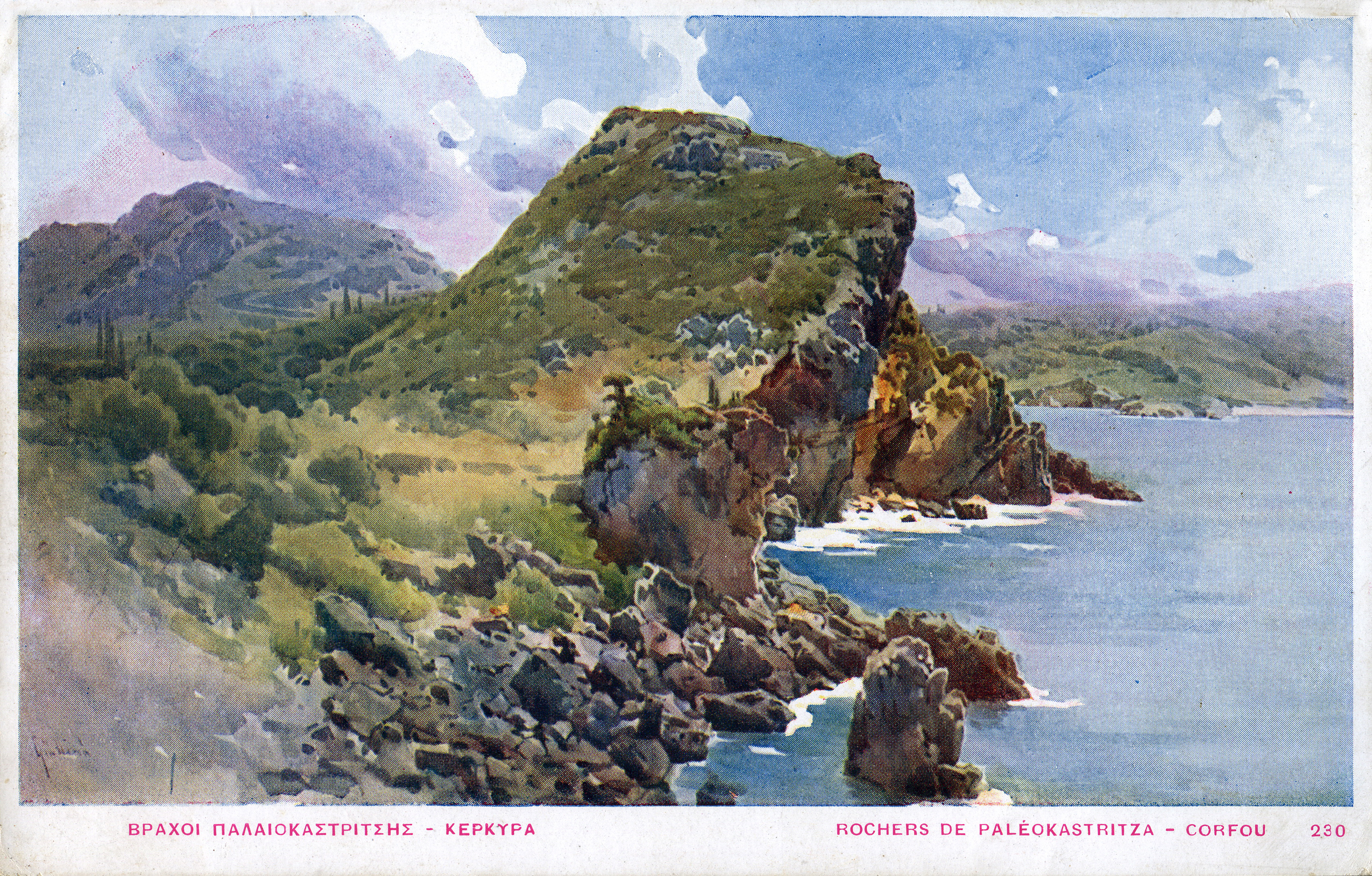
Aspiotis No. 230

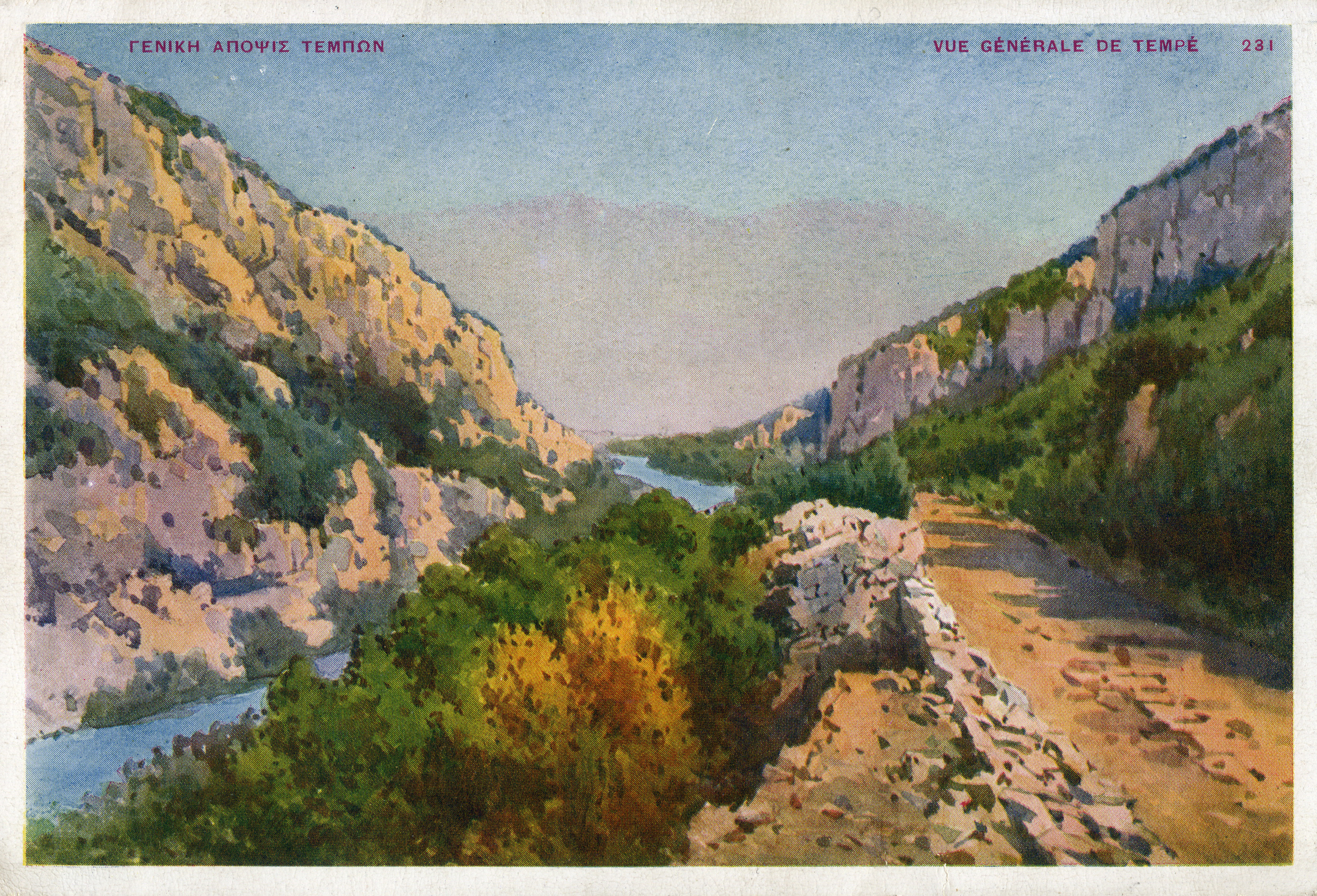
Aspiotis No. 231
