= Prometheus (1998 film) =

- Poster of the film
- Written by: Tony Harrison
- Screenplay by: Tony Harrison
- Release date: 1998
- Running time: 130 minutes
- Country: United Kingdom
- Languages: English and Ancient Greek
- Budget: 1.5 million pounds.

Prometheus is a 1998 film-poem created by English poet and playwright Tony Harrison. The film-poem examines the political and social issues connected to the fall of the working class in England, amidst the more general phenomenon of the collapse of socialism in Eastern Europe, using the myth of Prometheus as a metaphor for the struggles of the working class and the devastation brought on by political conflict and unfettered industrialisation. It was broadcast on Channel 4 and was also shown at the Locarno Film Festival. It was used by Harrison to highlight the plight of the workers both in Europe and in Britain. His film-poem begins in a post-industrialist wasteland in Yorkshire, the fallout from an historic confrontation between British miners and the government of Margaret Thatcher. It has been described as "the most important artistic reaction to the fall of the British working class" of the late twentieth century.

== Influence ==
Harrison has acknowledged that he was influenced by Percy Shelley's work Prometheus Unbound. Harrison actually started the planning of his film at the Baths of Caracalla in Rome so that he could be in the same city as Shelley when he was writing his drama.

== Plot ==
An elderly, emphysema-laden Yorkshire miner (Walter Sparrow) is about to retire. In a bleak, post-industrialist landscape, the old miner meets a boy (Jonathan Waintridge) who is reciting a poem about Prometheus. The miner eventually ends up in a depleted local cinema and, though sick with emphysema, he defiantly lights up a cigarette. With the old miner at the theatre, the run-down projection equipment suddenly comes to life and projections appear on the old screen.

The person directing these projections is Hermes, the messenger of Zeus. Both Hermes (Michael Feast) and Zeus personify the interests of capitalism in the film. Hermes, with a British upper-class accent which contrasts with the coalminer's warm, smoky, northern working-class accent, starts lecturing the coalminer about the failings of humankind. Hermes is presented as cruel and obnoxious, in one instance acting as the tallyman in a mine which has been designated to close, lowering the miners in the pit while attacking them in verse:

This is the terminus ad quem
For bolshy bastards such as them

As they give Hermes their tally, the miners quietly mumble expletives at him. In the pit scene Hermes also quotes verses 944-946 in ancient Greek from Prometheus Bound. Eventually, the old man starts seeing a huge golden statue of Prometheus, nicknamed Goldenballs in the film. It is revealed that the statue was made by melting the bodies of Yorkshire miners. The film traces the trip the statue takes in the back of a truck through Eastern Europe, revisiting the horrors of World War II European history in places such as Auschwitz, Dresden and the Polish industrial city of Nowa Huta. As they pass from these places, Hermes tries to have the locals denounce Prometheus, rather than Zeus, for their condition and all the ills he has brought them with his gift. Sometimes he succeeds – but not in Nowa Huta, where the locals refuse to denounce Prometheus, much to the chagrin of Hermes, who then lashes out at them through rhyming verses.

I should have known those stubborn Poles
still had Prometheus in their souls.
It angers Zeus. It riles. It galls
Such grovelling to Goldenballs.

In the end, the old coal miner, who represents the spirit of Prometheus in the film, arrives in Greece where he speaks about the powerful impact of fire on humankind.

== Analysis and reception ==
In Reception Studies it is mentioned that Harrison in his film has metaphorically "linked the gnawed liver of Prometheus to the eagle of genocide and the blackened lungs of the coalminers" and it was the bodies of the Yorkshire coalminers which were consumed by fire, as in Émile Zola's Germinal, that were used in the casting of the statue of Harrison's Prometheus.

Edith Hall has written that she is convinced that Harrison's Prometheus is "the most important artistic reaction to the fall of the British working class" at the end of the twentieth century, and considers it as "the most important adaptation of classical myth for a radical political purpose for years" and Harrison's "most brilliant artwork, with the possible exception of his stage play The Trackers of Oxyrhynchus".

Hall continues that Harrison's vision of a statue made by melting miners' bodies is a "horrific metamorphosis" where "miners’ bodies are transformed visually into bullion" and that such transformation "from concrete to abstract labor, and thence to symbolic capital" highlights Harrison's use of imagery which involves capitalist and Marxist economic theories of the twentieth century.

Edith Hall also compares the similarities between Harrison's work and Theo Angelopoulos' Ulysses' Gaze in that both works feature nonlinear-chronological movement through Eastern European places characterised by "monumental statuary" and classifies Harrison's Prometheus as a threnody although certain elements relating to the imagery of the film and its adaptation of classical themes also bring it closer to the film techniques of Michelakis. According to Lorna Hardwick, the film-poem attempts a new type of redemptive effect by using art as a "mirror to horrors" saving the audience from turning to stone, quoting Rowland's comments about Harrison's film-poem The Gaze of the Gorgon.

Helen Morales remarks that the Yorkshire coal miner "embodies the spirit of Prometheus" and that his dialogues with Hermes, "Zeus' cruel henchman", are "brilliant articulations of oppression and defiance".

Carol Dougherty mentions that in Harrison's 1995 play The Labourers of Herakles there is a scene where Hercules, while lying on his own funeral pyre, delivers a speech about the power of fire in a manner reminiscent of Harrison's treatment of the same theme in Prometheus.
