= Achilleion (Corfu) =

Palace in Greece

- Αχίλλειο/Αχίλλειον
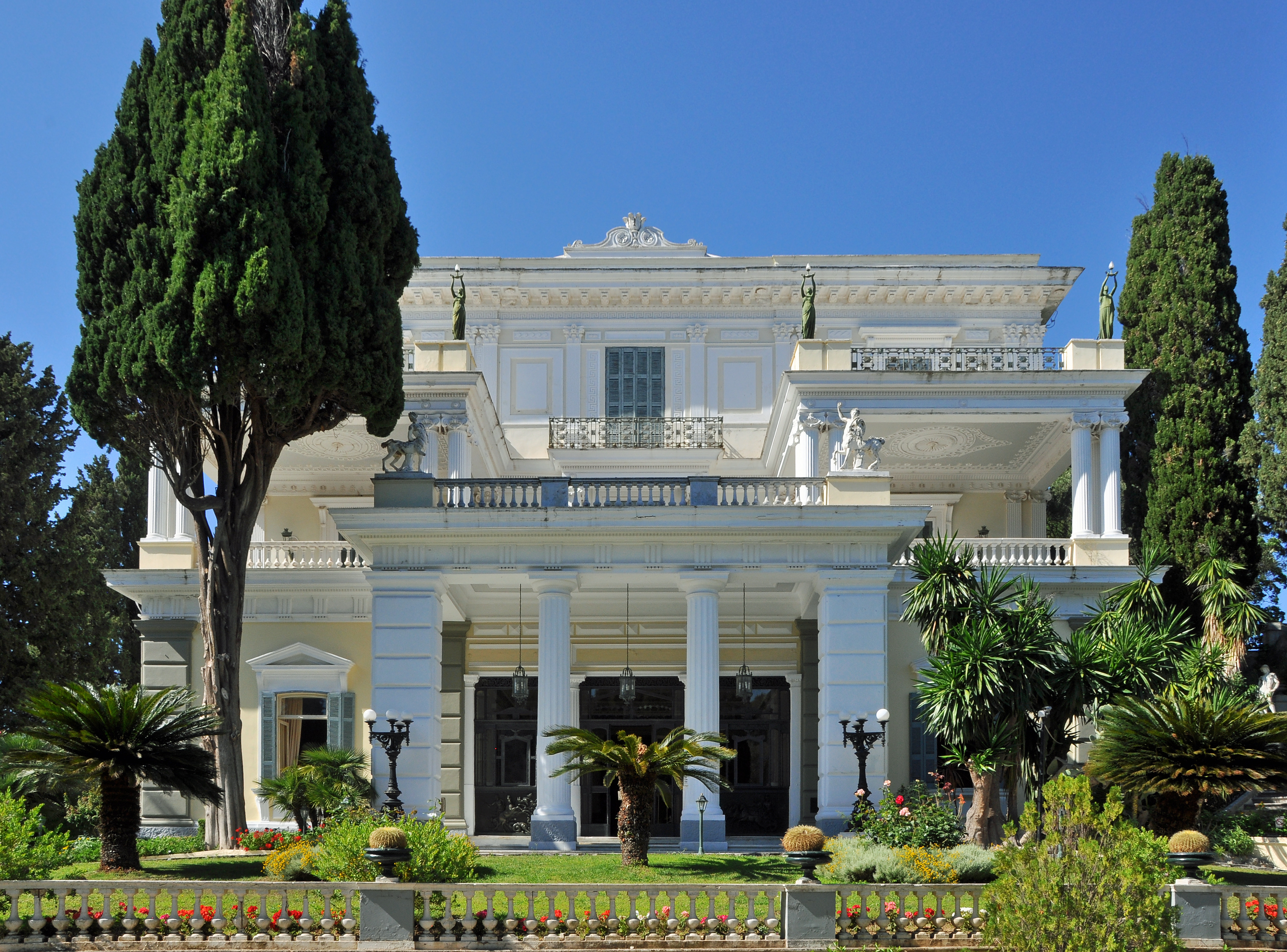
- The entrance of the museum, with Doric columns

- Location within Greece

General information
- Type: Palace
- Architectural style: Neoclassical
- Location: Gastouri, Corfu, Greece
- Coordinates: 39°33′45″N 19°54′15″E
- Construction started: 1889
- Completed: 1890
- Client: Empress Elisabeth of Austria

Design and construction
- Architect: Raffaele Caritto

The Achilleion (Greek: Αχίλλειο, Katharevousa: Αχίλλειον) is a palace built on Corfu for Empress Elisabeth of Austria after a suggestion by the Austrian consul Alexander von Warsberg. Elisabeth was deeply saddened by the loss of her only son, Crown Prince Rudolf of Austria following the Mayerling incident in 1889, and a year later she had this summer palace built as a refuge.

Achilleion is located at Gastouri, a village about ten kilometres south of the city of Corfu, and provides a panoramic view of the city to the north, and the southern part of the island, framed by the Ionian Sea to the east.

The architectural style was designed to suggest an ancient palace of mythical Phaeacia. The motif centers on the hero Achilles of Greek mythology, from which the name is derived. Corfu was Elisabeth's favourite vacation destination and she wanted a palace to gratify her admiration for Greece, its language and its culture.

The property currently operates as a museum under the management of the Hellenic Tourism Development Company, within the Greek National Tourism Organization.

== History ==
=== Creation by Empress Elisabeth ===
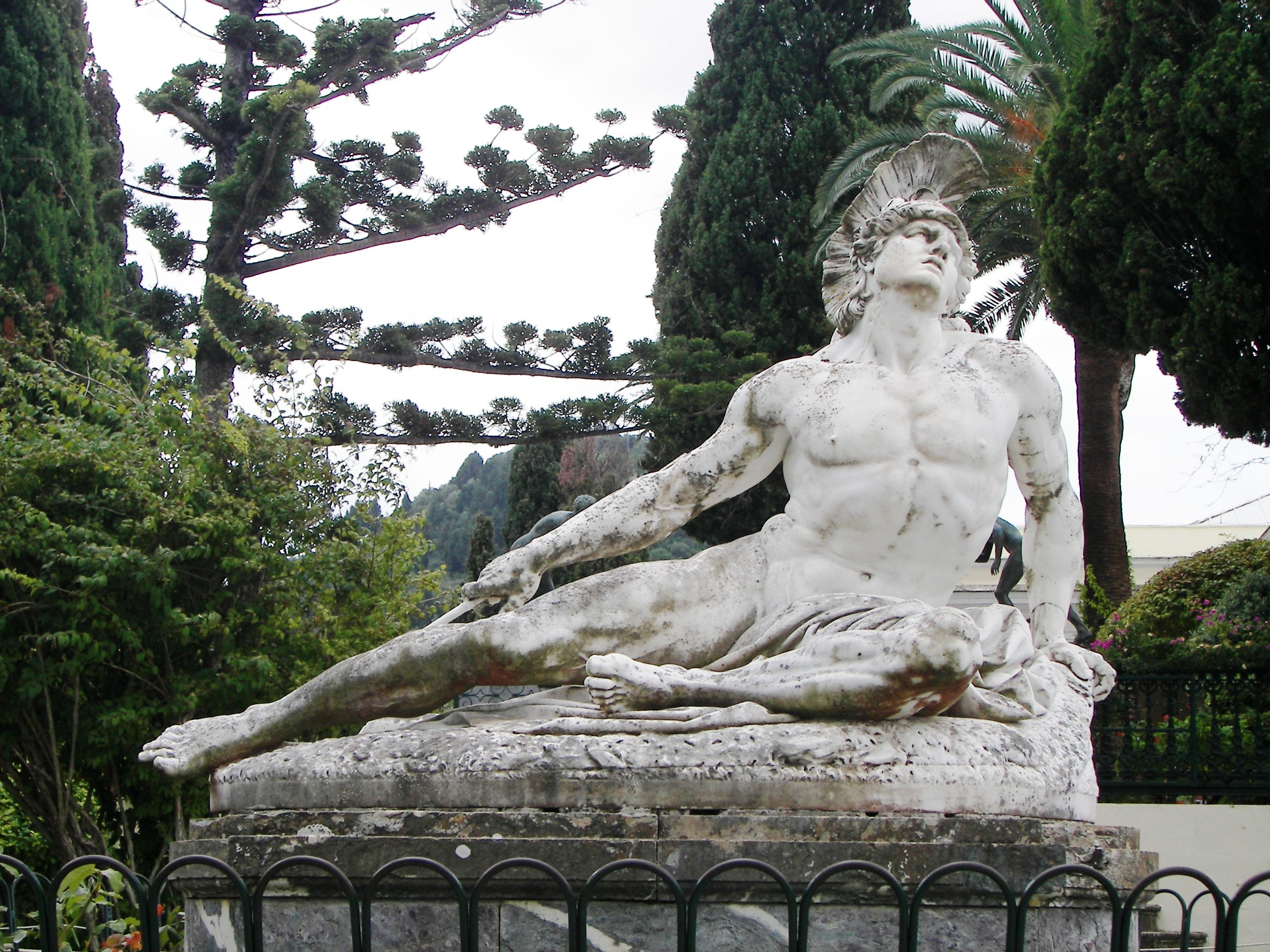
Dying Achilles (Achilleus thneskon) in the gardens. Achilles gazes skywards as if to seek help from the gods; his mother Thetis was a goddess

The Achilleion property was originally owned by Corfiote philosopher and diplomat Petros Vrailas-Armenis, and was known as "Villa Vraila". In 1888, the Empress of Austria after visiting the place decided that it was the ideal location for her own palace on Corfu.

"I want a palace with pillared colonnades and hanging gardens, protected from prying glances - a palace worthy of Achilles, who despised all mortals and did not fear even the gods."
Elisabeth of Austria

The palace was designed by Italian architect Raffaele Caritto and built on an area of 200,000 m^{2}. Elisabeth's husband, Emperor Franz Josef of Austria, had owned some nearby land as well. The German sculptor Ernst Herter was commissioned to create works inspired from Greek mythology. His sculpture Dying Achilles (Ancient Greek: Αχιλλεύς θνήσκων), created in Berlin in 1884 as inscribed in the statue, forms the centrepiece of the Achilleion Gardens.

The architectural design was intended to represent an ancient Phaeacian palace. The building, with the classical Greek statues that surround it, is a monument to platonic romanticism as well as escapism and was named after Achilles: Achilleion.

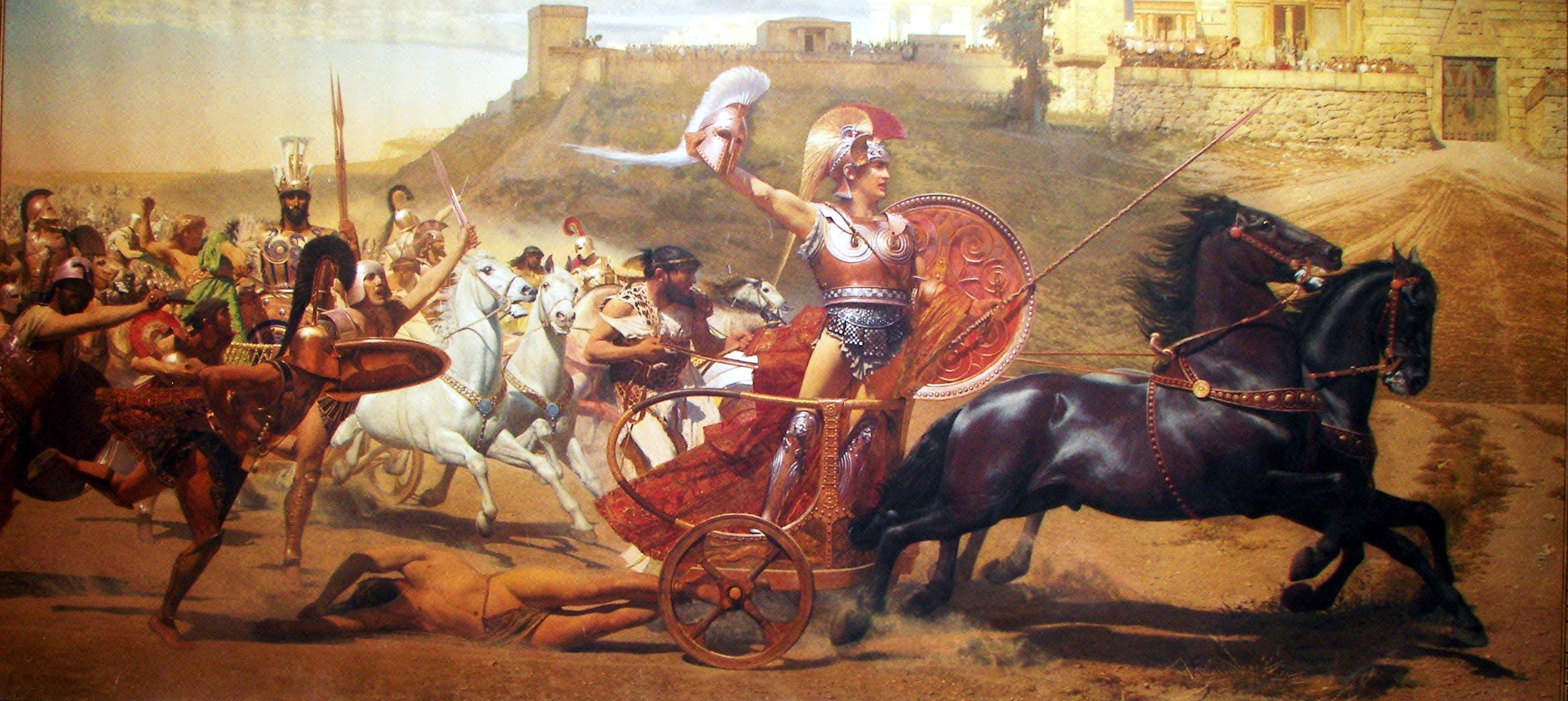
The Triumph of Achilles by Franz von Matsch; panoramic fresco (main hall, upper level). Achilles drags Hector's lifeless body at the Gates of Troy.

Paintings and statues of Achilles are abundant, both in the main hall and in the gardens, depicting contrasting heroic and tragic scenes of the Trojan War. The building is of Pompeian style and was decorated by Elisabeth with representations and statues. Elisabeth wrote that "I want a palace with pillared colonnades and hanging gardens, protected from prying glances — a palace worthy of Achilles, who despised all mortals and did not fear even the gods." She used the Achilleion only as a private palace, as a refuge from the world and her past; she received only her daughters Archduchess Marie Valerie and Archduchess Gisela with their husbands there. Elisabeth's husband, Emperor Franz Joseph, did not like sea voyages and never saw the palace.

The gardens on top of the hill provide a scenic view of the surrounding green hills and valleys, with the Ionian Sea in the background.

Elisabeth frequently visited Achilleion until spring 1896. She lost interest in her palace though and even considered selling it. Much of the interior was moved back to Vienna. In September 1898 Elisabeth was assassinated by Italian anarchist Luigi Lucheni in Geneva.

=== The Kaiser ===
Achilleion was inherited by Elisabeth's daughter, Archduchess Gisela, but was not used often. German Kaiser Wilhelm II purchased Achilleion in 1907 and used it as a summer residence. During Kaiser Wilhelm's visits substantial diplomatic activity occurred in Achilleion and it became a hub of European diplomacy. The Greek royal family, and particularly Wilhelm's sister Sophia of Prussia, the crown princess and later queen consort of Greece, often came to visit Corfu. The Kaiser also invited intellectuals like the German archaeologist Wilhelm Dörpfeld to his retreat. The Emperor had a great interest in the plants of the park and hired Carl Ludwig Sprenger, a renowned botanist, who would live in the palace for about three months every year. Wilhelm mainly came to Achilleion during the Easter season as he enjoyed the local festivities and cultural events. The German imperial family stayed on Corfu for about one month every year until the outbreak of World War I, except in 1910 and 1913 when they did not go there due to political conflicts on the Balkans.

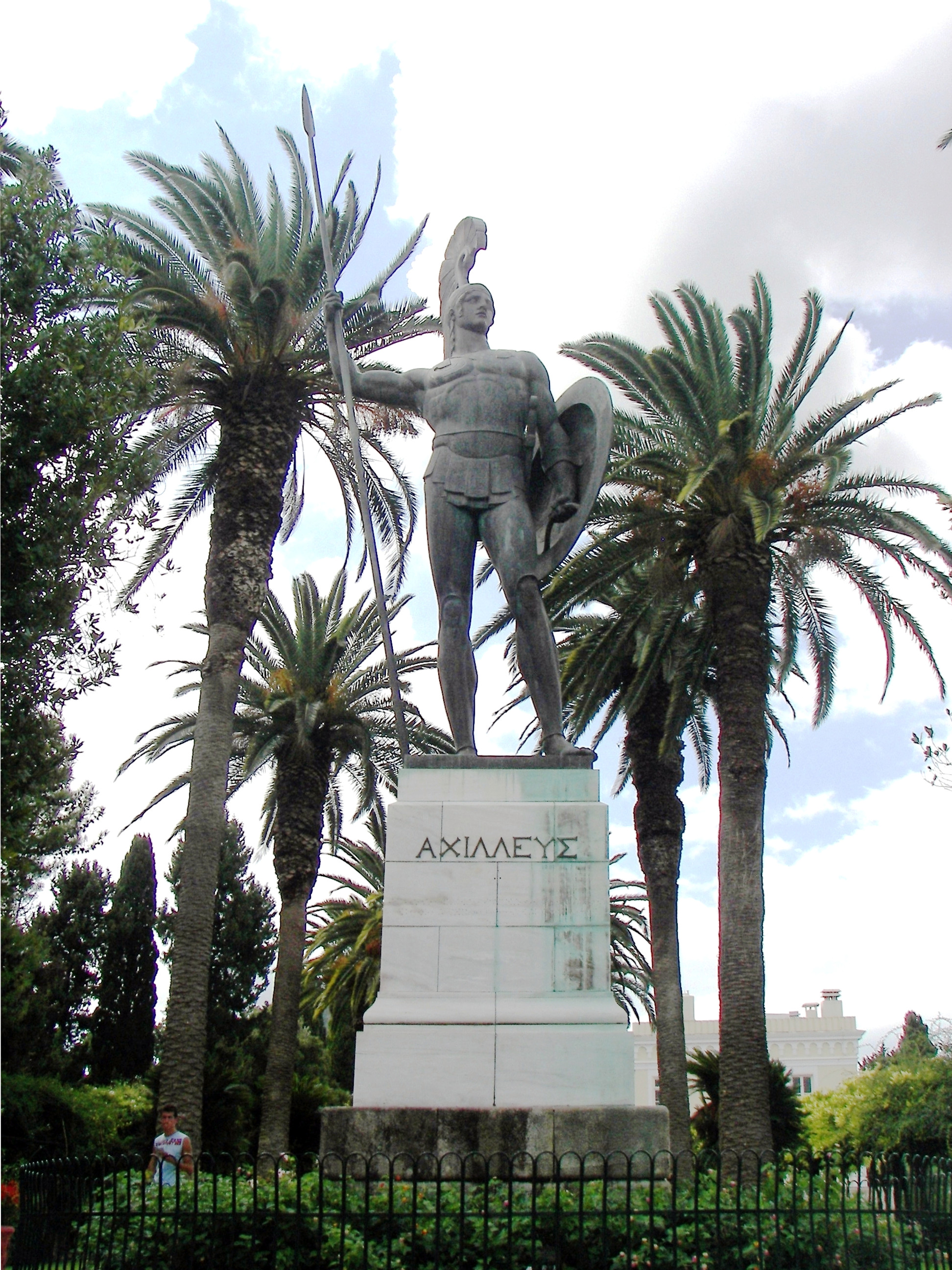
Achilles as guardian of the palace in the gardens, gazing northward toward the city. The inscription in Greek reads: ΑΧΙΛΛΕΥΣ ("Achilles"); commissioned by Kaiser Wilhelm II

Wilhelm, expanding on the main theme of the grounds, commissioned his own Achilles statue from the sculptor Johannes Götz who created an imposing bronze sculpture that stands as guardian of the gardens, facing north toward the city.

Archaeologist Reinhard Kekulé von Stradonitz, who was also the Kaiser's advisor, was invited by the Kaiser to come to Corfu for advice as to where to position the huge statue. This tribute to Achilles from the Kaiser was inscribed at the statue's base, also by Kekulé:

To the Greatest Greek from the Greatest German

The inscription was subsequently removed after World War II.

The Kaiser's statue represents Achilles in full hoplite uniform with intricate detailing such as a relief of a gorgon's head at the shield, apparently to petrify any enemies. This tall statue is surrounded by palm trees that complement its graceful outline. Kaiser Wilhelm visited the palace until 1914 when World War I was declared. The Kaiser also attended performances at the Municipal Theatre of Corfu while vacationing at the Achilleion.

The Kaiser, while vacationing at Achilleion and while Europe was preparing for war, had been involved in excavations at the site of the ancient temple of Artemis in Corfu. He also removed the statue of German poet Heinrich Heine which Empress Elisabeth had installed at Achilleion. Kaiser's actions became the subject of the 1992 film-poem The Gaze of the Gorgon, written by British poet Tony Harrison.

=== The World Wars ===
During World War I, the Achilleion was used as a military hospital by French and Serbian troops. After World War I, it became the property of the Greek state according to the treaty of Versailles and the war reparations that followed in 1919.

From about 1921 to 1924, the palace housed an orphanage, which accommodated Armenian orphans from Constantinople. In the remaining years between the two world wars, the Achilleion property was used for various government functions and a number of artifacts were auctioned off.

During World War II, the Axis powers used the Achilleion as military headquarters. After the war, the Achilleion came under the management umbrella of the Hellenic Tourist Organisation (HTO).

=== Later ===
In 1962, the Achilleion was leased to a private company that converted the upper level to a casino and the lower grounds to a museum. In 1983 the lease was terminated and the palace management was returned to the HTO.

=== Conference ===
In September 1979, twelve historians from the United States, the United Kingdom, and Germany, assembled to discuss Kaiser Wilhelm's character and the historical role he played in German politics and society. The conference was held in what had once been the Kaiser's bed-chamber and the proceedings were published in the book Kaiser Wilhelm II New Interpretations: The Corfu Papers.

=== European role ===
Briefly reclaiming the status of centre for European diplomacy that it possessed during the Kaiser years, the Achilleion has been used in recent times for the European summit in 1994, and in 2003 it hosted the meeting of the European ministers for Agriculture. Lately it has been used as a museum while the casino function has been relocated to the Corfu Hilton.

== Achilleion in film ==
The casino scene of the James Bond film For Your Eyes Only (1981) was filmed at the Achilleion.

Achilleion is also featured Tony Harrison's 1992 film-poem The Gaze of the Gorgon when a chorus of tourists says in rhyming verse:

Soon, in 1994,
in this palace Greece starts to restore,
in this the Kaiser's old retreat
Europe's heads of state will meet...

== Gallery ==
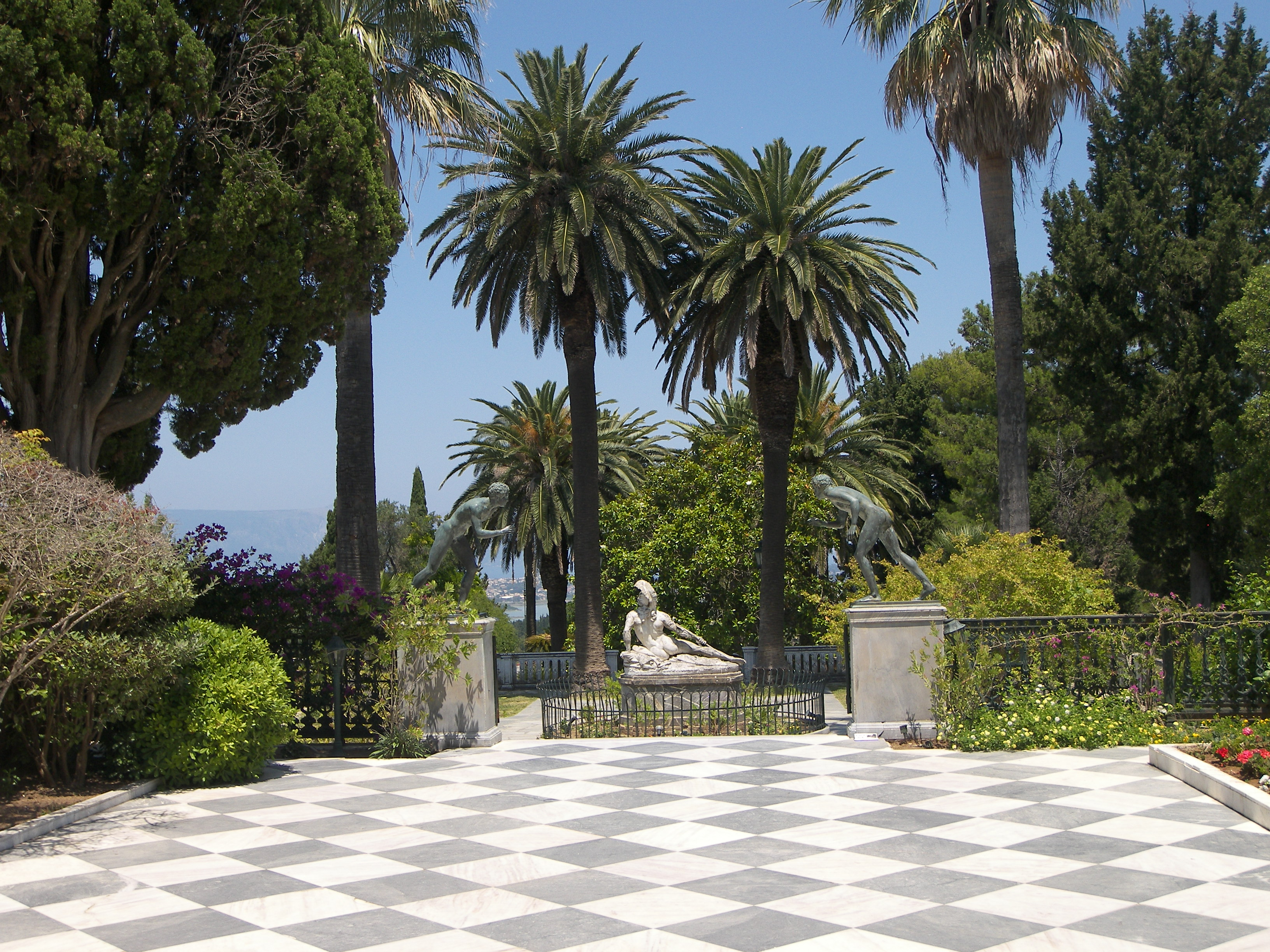
Statues in the terrace

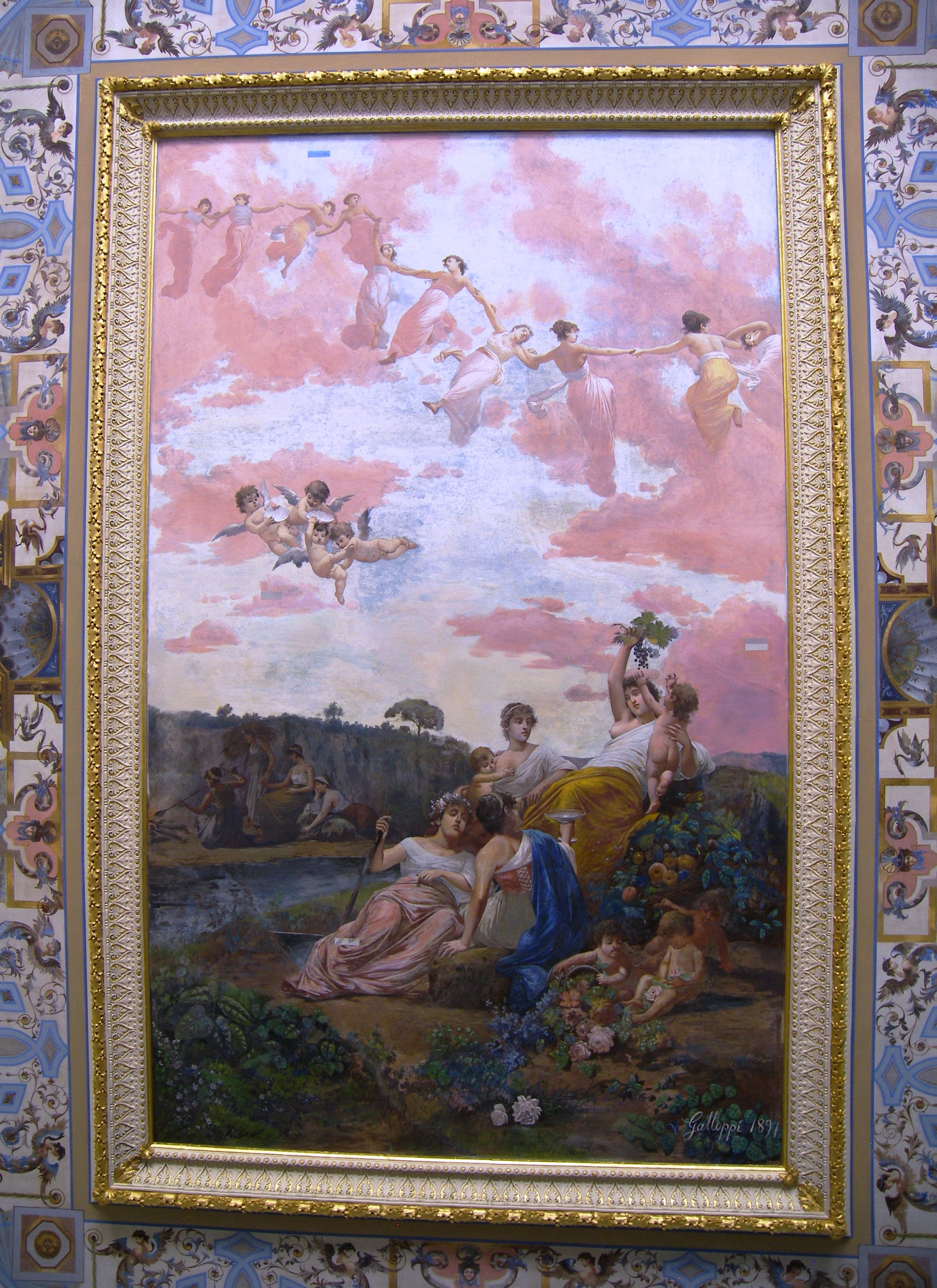
Ceiling painting by Vincenzo Galloppi at the main entrance

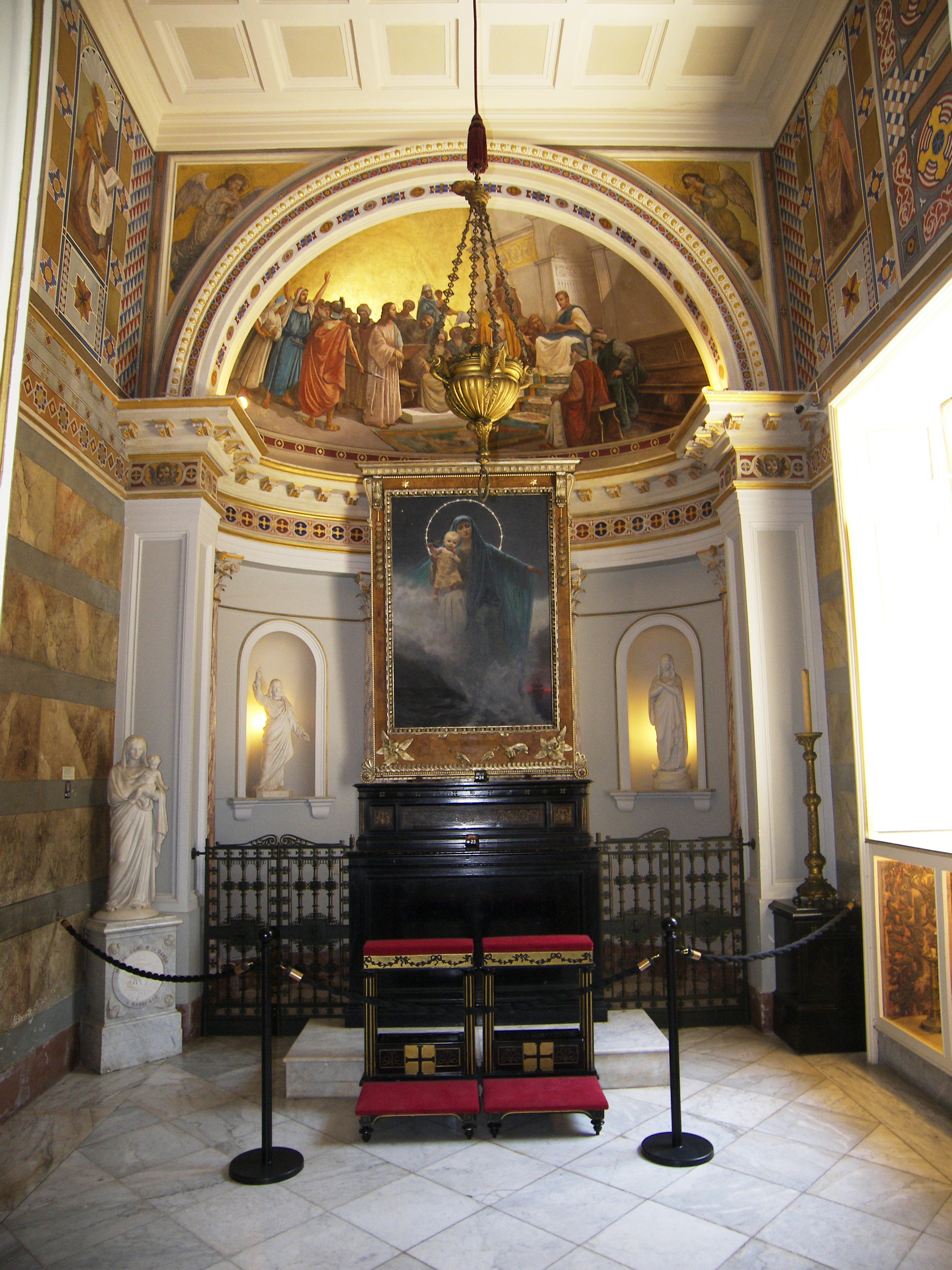
The chapel

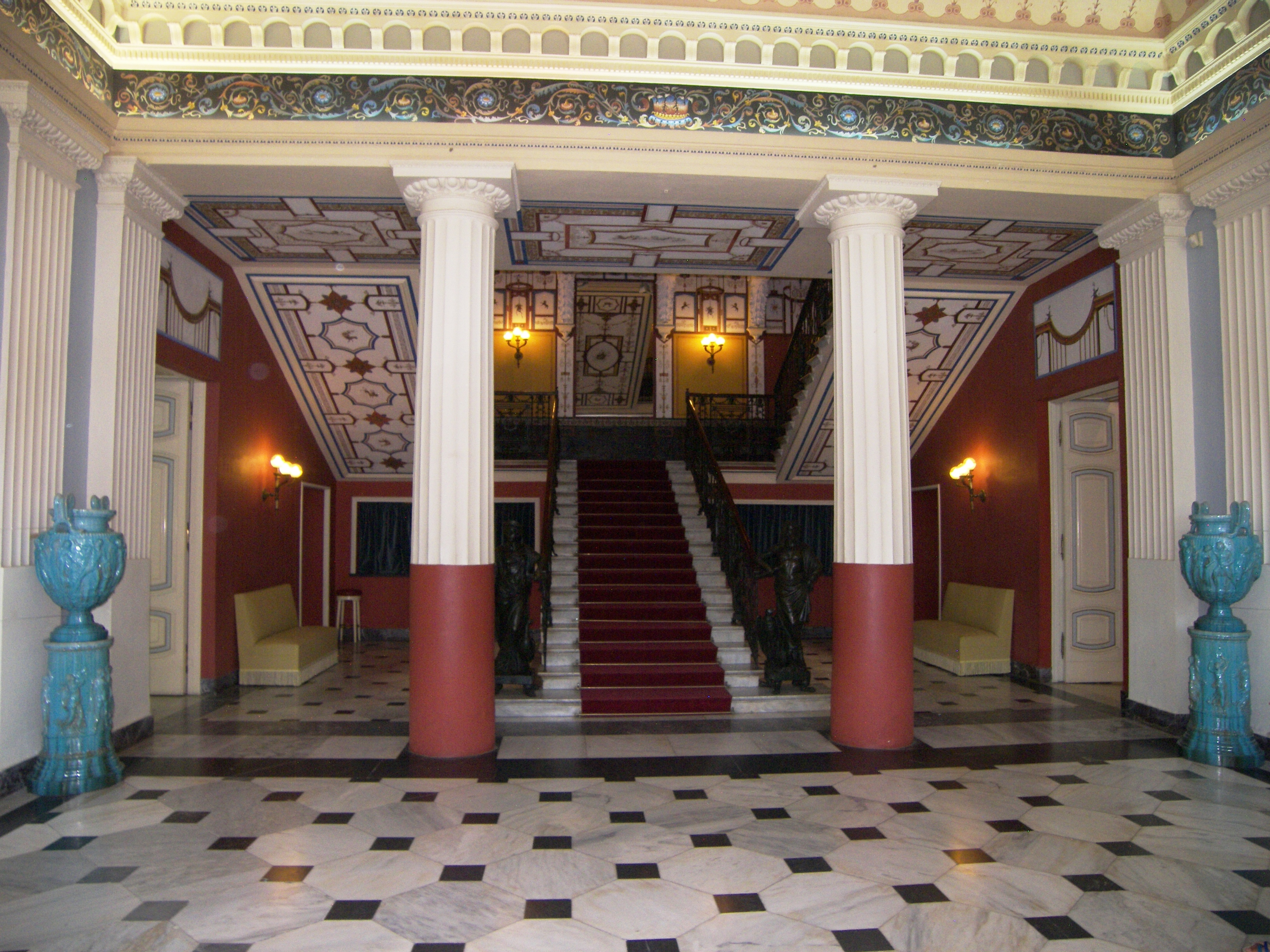
The main staircase

Kaiser's Bridge ca. 1918, before its destruction by the Wehrmacht, at the foot of the Achilleion
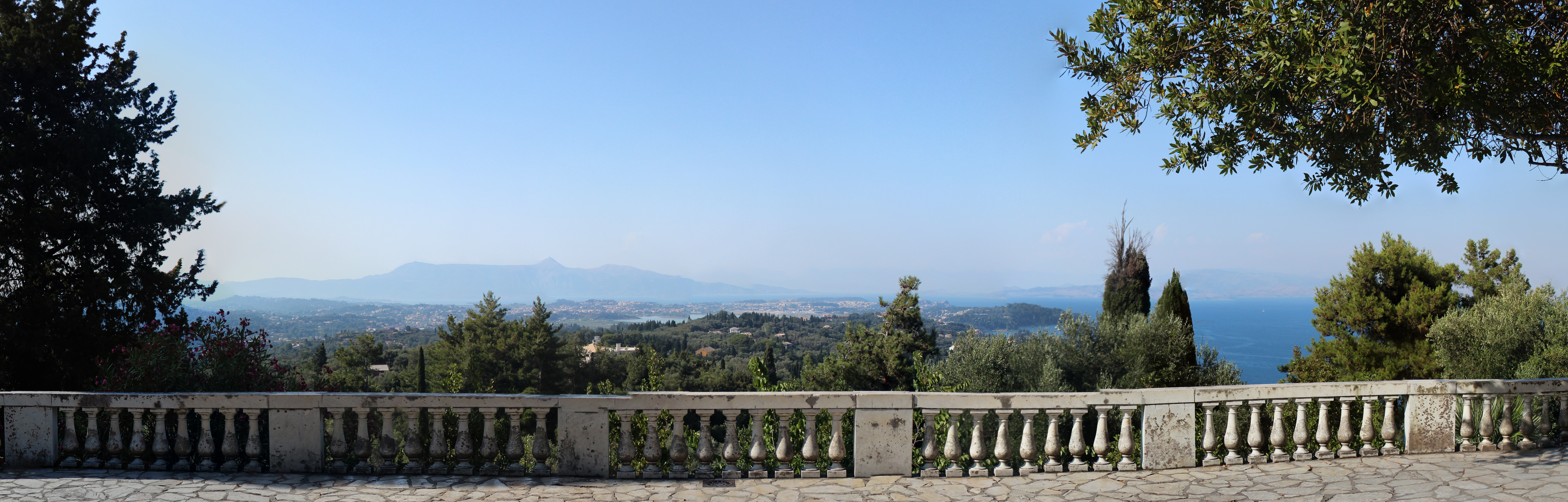
Panoramic view from Achilleion balcony towards Corfu-city

== Bibliography ==
- Kardamitsi-Adami, Maro (2009). Palaces in Greece. Melissa Books. ISBN 978-960-204-289-2.
- Haderer, Stefan (2022). Under the Spell of a Myth: Empress Sisi in Greece. KDP Publishing. ISBN 979-884-421-950-4.
- Haderer, Stefan (2018). "A Fairytale Palace on Corfu. I: The Achilleion and Empress Elisabeth of Austria". Royalty Digest Quarterly. ISSN 1653-5219.
- Haderer, Stefan (2019). "A Fairytale Palace on Corfu. II: The Achilleion and German Emperor Wilhelm II". Royalty Digest Quarterly. ISSN 1653-5219.
