= Achilleio =

Achilleio Αχίλλειο
- Municipal unit
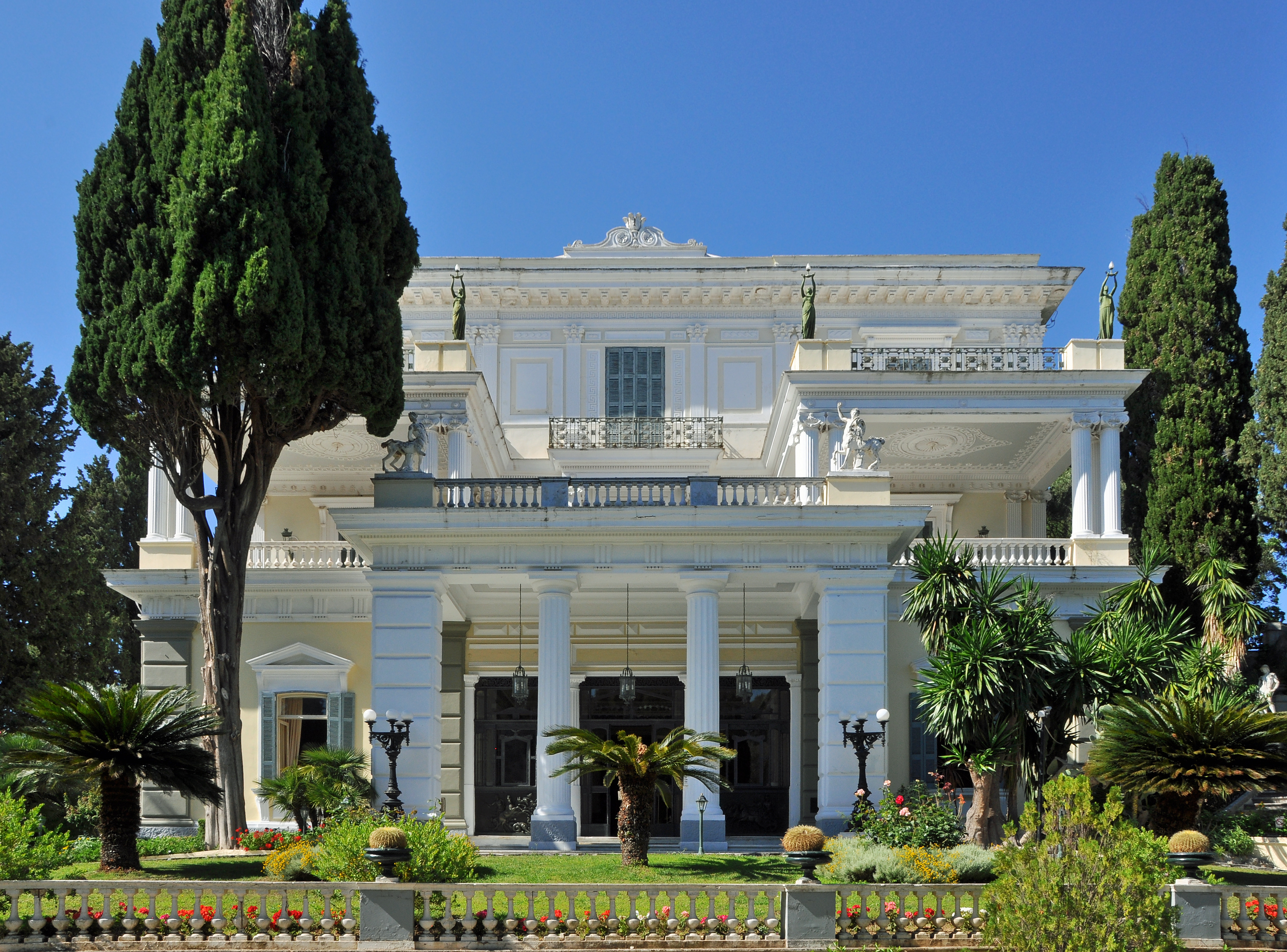
- Achilleion

- Location within the regional unit

- Location within Greece
- Coordinates: 39°34′N 19°54′E
- Country: Greece
- Administrative region: Ionian Islands
- Regional unit: Corfu
- Municipality: Central Corfu and Diapontia Islands

Area
  - Municipal unit: 48.7 km^{2} (18.8 sq mi)

Population (2021)
  - Municipal unit: 10,134
  - Municipal unit density: 208/km^{2} (539/sq mi)
- Time zone: UTC+2 (EET)
  - Summer (DST): UTC+3 (EEST)
- Vehicle registration: ΚΥ

Achilleio (Greek: Αχίλλειο) is a former municipality on the island of Corfu, Ionian Islands, Greece. Since the 2019 local government reform it is part of the municipality Central Corfu and Diapontia Islands, of which it is a municipal unit. It is located in the south-central part of the island of Corfu, south of Corfu (city). It has a land area of 48.650 km² and a population of 10,134 inhabitants (2021 census). The seat of the municipality was the town of Gastouri (pop. 1,303). The municipality took its name from the palace Achilleion that Empress Elisabeth of Austria built there. The largest communities are Gastouri, Kynopiastes, Viros, Perama, Benitses, Káto Garoúna, and Kastellánoi.
