= Walter Sparrow =

English actor (1927–2000)

- Born: Walter Leonard Sparrow; 22 January 1927; Eltham, London, England
- Died: 31 May 2000 (aged 73)
- Occupation: Actor

Walter Leonard Sparrow (22 January 1927 – 31 May 2000) was an English film and television actor best known for his appearance as Duncan in the 1991 film Robin Hood: Prince of Thieves starring Kevin Costner.

Born in Eltham, London in 1927, Sparrow began his career as a stand-up comic before moving to acting with a period with the Royal Shakespeare Company. His first film role was in 1964, in Dr. Terror's House of Horrors, with Christopher Lee. Subsequent films, interspersed between countless TV appearances, included the 1969 sex fantasy Zeta One, Young Sherlock Holmes, and the acclaimed 1988 film The Accidental Tourist starring William Hurt, Kathleen Turner and Geena Davis.

His career enjoyed a resurgence in the 1990s, with Sparrow playing key roles in the 1991 film Robin Hood: Prince of Thieves as the blinded retainer Duncan, 1993's The Secret Garden as gruff gardener Ben Weatherstaff, and the 1995 American coming-of-age film Now and Then as tragic drifter 'Crazy Pete'. In 1998 he starred in Tony Harrison's film Prometheus.

He received positive notice for his role in television serial The Mind of the Enemy (1965).

Sparrow's even more prolific TV appearances included regular roles in the soap opera Emmerdale Farm, as three different minor characters in 1980, 1987 and 1993, and the comedy Paris, and guest spots on Hugh and I, Adam Adamant Lives!, Randall and Hopkirk (Deceased), Z-Cars, The Onedin Line, All Creatures Great and Small, Alas Smith and Jones, Rumpole of the Bailey, One Foot in the Grave, Ernie in Birds of a Feather, and The Bill among many others.

Sparrow is also well known for playing Maurice, a peasant who was threatened to be shipped to the Americas, in the 1998 Cinderella remake Ever After.

One of his more notable guest appearances was in the 1989 episode Danger UXD of the sitcom Only Fools and Horses, which had 16.1 million viewers, as sex shop owner Dirty Barry. His last appearance was in 2000 in an episode of the BBC's medical drama series Doctors.

== Filmography ==
Year	Title	Role	Notes
1963	A Stitch in Time	Gardener	Uncredited
1965	Dr. Terror's House of Horrors	Second Ambulance Man	(segment "Disembodied Hand"), Uncredited
1965	City Under the Sea	Second Fisherman	Uncredited
1969	Zeta One	Stage Manager	
1969	The Champions	George Whetlor	Episode: "The Night People"
1970	Cool It Carol!	Cameraman	
1975	The Adventure of Sherlock Holmes' Smarter Brother	Henchman	Uncredited
1978	The Famous Five (1978 tv series)	Salomon "Sully" Weston	Episode: "Five Get into Trouble": Part 1 & 2
1978	Rumpole of the Bailey	Harry Harris	Episode: Runpole and the Learned Friends
1983	Give Us a Break	Alan Clegg	Episode: Heaven Sent
1985	Young Sherlock Holmes	Ethan Engel	
1988	The Accidental Tourist	Hot Dog Vendor	
1989	Only Fools And Horses	Dirty Barry	Episode: "Danger UXD" Series 6 Episode 2
1990	One Foot in the Grave	George	Episode: "The Valley of Fear"
1990	I Hired a Contract Killer	Hotel Porter	
1991	Robin Hood: Prince of Thieves	Duncan	
1991	Let Him Have It	Nightwatchman	
1993	The Secret Garden	Ben Weatherstaff	
1993	U.F.O.	Fred Paxford	
1994	Don't Get Me Started	Nurse	Uncredited
1994	Dirtysomething	Bill	
1995	Now and Then	Crazy Pete	
1995	The Famous Five (1995 tv series)	Grandad	Episode: "Five on Finniston Farm"
1996	Jane Eyre	Lord Eshton	
1997	The Woodlanders	Old Creedle	
1998	Ever After	Maurice	
1998	Prometheus	Grandad	
1999	Treasure Island	Ben Gunn	
1999	Simon Magus	Benjamin	
