= The Trackers of Oxyrhynchus =

- Original language: English
- Written by: Tony Harrison
- Characters: Apollo, Silenus, Hermes, Bernard Grenfell, Arthur Hunt, Kyllene, Satyrs
- Subject: Ichneutae
- Genre: Satyr play
- Setting: Oxyrhynchus, Oxford, Ancient Greece

Premiere
- Date: 12 July 1988
- Place: Delphi, Greece

The Trackers of Oxyrhynchus is a 1990 play by English poet and playwright Tony Harrison. It is partially based on Ichneutae, a satyr play by the fifth-century BC Athenian dramatist Sophocles, which was found in fragments at the Egyptian city of Oxyrhynchus.

In addition to its classical content, Harrison's play is also a dramatised account of the discovery of the papyrus fragments containing Sophocles' play by Bernard Grenfell and Arthur Hunt. The play had a one-performance première on 12 July 1988 in the ancient stadium of Delphi, Greece with a follow-up performance at the Royal National Theatre two years later on 27 March 1990. The 1988 premiere at Delphi starred Jack Shepherd as Grenfell, Barrie Rutter as Hunt and Juliet Stevenson in the role of the mountain nymph Kyllene. No filming was allowed during the 1988 performance. Before appearing on the stage in London the play also had a "homecoming" performance at Salt's Mill, a former textile mill, at Saltaire, Bradford. Additional performances were held at the Wharf Theatre, in Sydney, Australia in 1992 and the West Yorkshire Playhouse in Leeds in 1998. In January 2017 after nearly 30 years since first opening in London it returned to the Finborough Theatre.

== Historical background ==
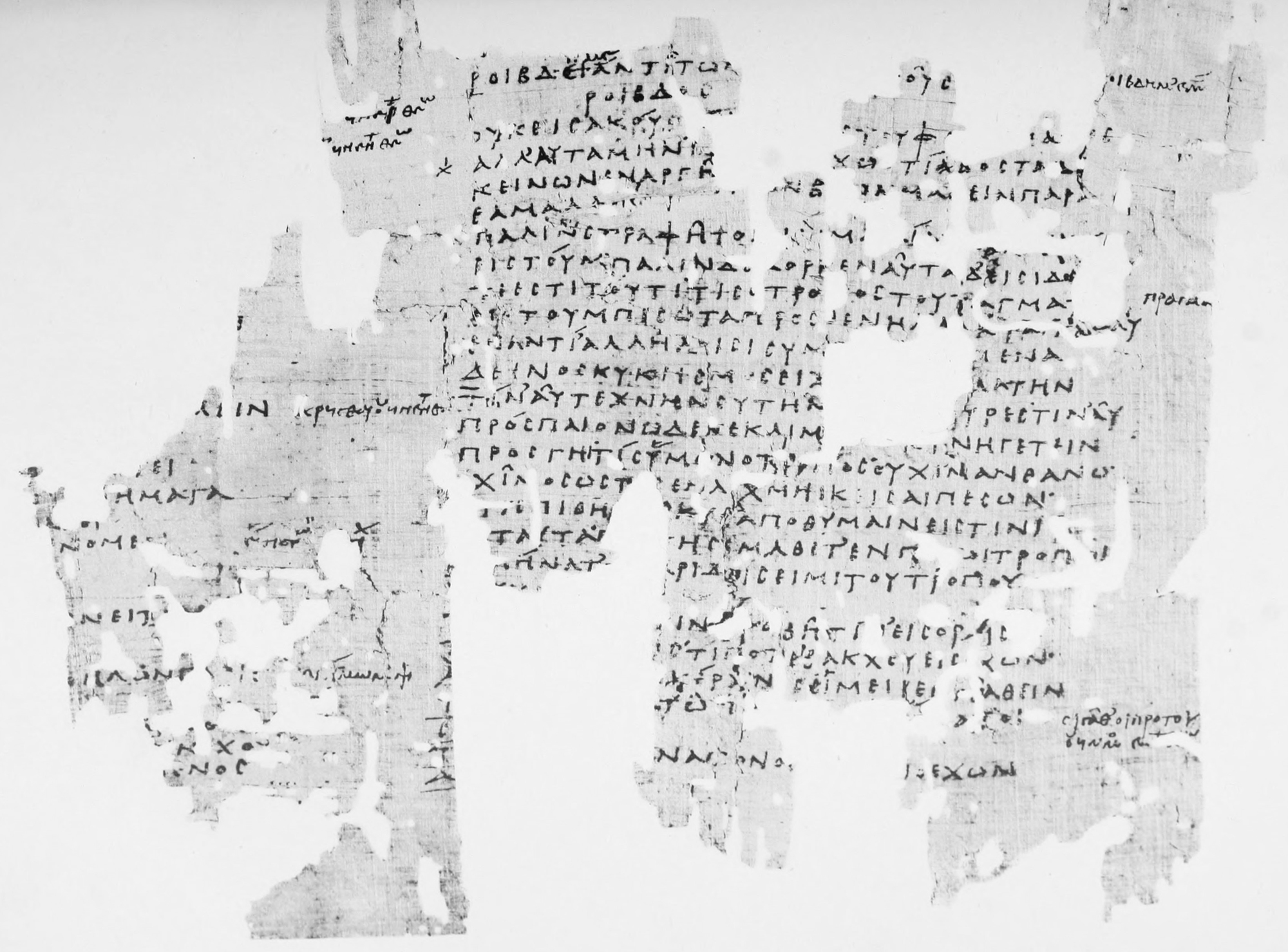
Fragment of the Ichneutae papyrus on which Harrison's play is based

Harrison's play is partially based on the events surrounding the discovery of the ancient papyrus found at Oxyrhynchus containing fragments of Ichneutae, a satyr play by the fifth-century Athenian dramatist Sophocles, which was found in fragments at Oxyrhynchus, an Egyptian city where an archaeological site was discovered considered one of the most important ever found. The papyrus fragments containing the ancient play were found by Oxford dons Grenfell and Hunt. Harrison then takes some of the events surrounding their discovery and weaves a play involving the two British archaeologists in a modern version of the classic play.

== Plot ==
The play starts with the two archaeologists shown doing excavations in situ at Oxyrhynchus in 1907. While both are depicted in the play deeply involved with their work, Apollo intervenes and commands Grenfell, in rhyming verses, to find an ancient play where the God plays a prominent part:

He heard Apollo yammering for scraps and tatters
of a lost play of Sophocles: The Tracking Satyrs.
"Grenfell, Hunt!" he heard the voice abjure.
"Prevent Apollo's play becoming mere manure."
Night and day the voice went: "Grenfell, Bernard Pyne,
hunt for my papyrus. This order is divine!"

Grenfell and Hunt on the site of the excavations. Harrison's play features them as central characters.

The two dons are shown in the play to feverishly search for the fragments and they finally find them. Grenfell, in particular, is shown as possessed by Apollo. After their excavations, the Oxyrhynchus papyri, including those with the Sophoclean play, are packed in wooden crates and sent to Oxford for further study. Upon arrival at Oxford, the crates open up and a satyr chorus springs from inside, clogging.

A metamorphosis then happens. Grenfell becomes the Greek god Apollo while Hunt turns into Silenus, the leader of the satyrs. The characters then start following Sophocles' play and begin looking for Apollo's missing cattle. Apollo strikes a bargain with the satyrs according to which the satyrs will become rich and free if they find his cattle.

The satyrs finally find the cattle only to discover that the cows are also keeping amongst them baby Hermes who although an infant has just invented the lyre. Apollo is happy now that his cattle have been found and keeps his end of the bargain by granting the satyrs the riches and freedom he had promised them. However the satyrs also want to keep the newly discovered lyre but Apollo rejects that idea telling them that satyrs do not deserve such a highly artistic instrument and advises them that they should instead concentrate on low-level art.

The satyrs are very unhappy and they become even more so since the gold bars that they received from Apollo have turned into gold leaf-covered boomboxes blaring a music they cannot even dance to. Having lost their chance to get involved in "High Art" the satyrs rebel and 2500 years later they become hooligans coming out of the crates and destroying the very papyrus to which they owe their existence in modern times.

In the Delphi performance the satyrs destroy the backdrop papyrus screens of the play and are depicted playing a soccer match with a ball fashioned out of the Ichneutae papyrus. In the National Theatre performance Silenus is shown destroying the physical papyrus screen which functions as the backdrop of the theatrical play and commenting that the papyrus "could be put to better use as bedding material for the homeless of London's South Bank".

== Reception and analysis ==
Richard Eyre calls The Trackers of Oxyrhynchus, which features satyrs jumping out of box crates clog dancing, "among the five most imaginative pieces of drama in the 90s". Jocelyn Herbert, famous designer of the British theatrical scene, comments that Harrison is aware of the dramatic visual impact of his ideas: "The idea of satyrs jumping out of boxes in Trackers is wonderful for the stage. Some writers just write and have little idea what it will look like, but Tony always knows exactly what he wants."

Edith Hall has written that she is convinced that Harrison's 1998 film-poem Prometheus is Harrison's "most brilliant artwork, with the possible exception of his stage play The Trackers of Oxyrhynchus".

Punch magazine writes that "Despite its jawbreaking title, The Trackers of Oxyrhynchus is a very merry and mischievous play, which turns serious and even harrowing, not through any visual violence but in the unnerving poetry of Tony Harrison".

Having been brought back to life through the rediscovered papyri the characters voice their grief at their neglected condition. Apollo laments through verse:

Covered in rubbish! But what's much worse is
being resurrected with scarcely half my verses.
Converted into dust and bookworm excreta
riddled lines with just a ghost of their metre.

In a critique contained in the book Tragedy in Transition it is mentioned that Harrison's play with its chaotic, lively, dynamic and sometimes fragmented verses, to match the condition of the papyri, contrasts with the stilted coverage of classics during the Edwardian era. In that sense Harrison may be pointing toward a neoclassicism which could indicate to a complacent and ignorant modern society that there are things which cannot be "assimilated". Harrison uses one of the satyrs in his work to hint that the classical world may be neglected in the modern era:

You, gormless grovelling sod
being so servile to that sodding god
got us stuck here in Great bloody Britain
where nowt about satyrs'll ever get written

The Routledge Companion to Directors' Shakespeare quotes Harrison as saying that without the satyr plays we are missing the whole picture of the Greek imagination as applied to ancient Greek tragedy and its ability to use the satyr plays as a vehicle to absorb the impact of the tragic events and to not be defeated by them. In that sense, Harrison continues, the satyr plays precipitated a "spirit of celebration" into the dramatic festival which also caused a "release into the worship of Dionysus". According to the same book, with his Trackers, Harrison wants to criticise the tendency of the elitists and right-wing politicians to divide art and society along refined and popular lines, represented by separate Apollonian and Dionysiac camps.

Harrison made a point against this artificial segregation by choosing a third venue for the performance of his play between Delphi and London; he chose an abandoned textile mill in Salt's Mill, Bradford, as a "homecoming" for his play. Harrison said that he chose Salt's Mill as a venue because the "ghosts of the past were strong" in that place and it was part of his "slow burning revenge" against his teacher who "denied him the opportunity to recite poetry or take part in plays because of his accent". He also mentioned that clogging "geared the satyrs into action", because that dance is "one of the principal expressions of the rhythm of life".

In A Companion to Sophocles Harrison's work is cited as an example of bidirectional influence, in that the ancient play influenced Harrison's work and in turn Harrison's play is shown to have influenced the modern perception of Sophocles and his works. According to the book, the papyrus is used as the stage background of Harrison's play both at the Delphi performance and in London at the Olivier Theatre. Its physical presence as a stage backdrop was used as a constant reference to the origin of the characters. It also functions as a visual device and a highly visible reminder of the barrier between the world of high art and that of the hooligans and the homeless.

T. P. Wiseman remarks that Harrison has "opened up the possibilities" of an ancient Greek play which was until recently the exclusive domain of scholars specialising in the classics. According to Wiseman, Harrison's achievement is mirrored by the scene in his play when a chorus of satyrs jumps out of the papyrus crates.

Mary Beard writes that Harrison through his play focuses on the reasons for searching and studying the classics. Hunt is depicted as "down-to-earth", searching for real-life records registering problems such as the desperate pleas of the homeless of that era. But Grenfell is shown as keenly searching for fragments of ancient poetry. According to Beard, Harrison uses this dichotomy to pose a question as to the value and purpose the study of classics has for the modern world; it can be used as a source of information regarding the power politics of the ancient world with its social deprivations, slavery and misogyny or it can be studied for the value of the classical literature that can "still engage and inspire".

== Recent adaptations ==
The Trackers of Oxyrhynchus was performed for the first time in 30 years at the Finborough Theatre in January 2017. It was directed by Jimmy Walters in a joint venture with his company Proud Haddock and Neil McPherson at the Finborough Theatre. The production received excellent reviews with The Guardian writing "there is nothing limp about Jimmy Walters' production".
