= The Blasphemers' Banquet =

- Directed by: Peter Symes
- Written by: Tony Harrison
- Screenplay by: Tony Harrison
- Produced by: BBC
- Release date: 31 July 1989
- Running time: 40 minutes
- Country: United Kingdom
- Language: English

The Blasphemers' Banquet is a film-poem created in 1989 by English poet and playwright Tony Harrison which examines censorship arising from religious issues. It was created in part as a response to the Salman Rushdie controversy surrounding his publication of The Satanic Verses. It was aired by the BBC 1's programme Byline on 31 July 1989.

The verse-film is set at the Omar Khayyám restaurant in Bradford where Harrison is holding a banquet with invited guests such as Omar Khayyám, Salman Rushdie, Voltaire, Molière and Byron.

The film at the time of its airing created a controversy in Britain when then Archbishop of Canterbury Robert Runcie advised the BBC to postpone the showing of the film and the BBC writing a reply to him defending the airing of the broadcast.

== Plot ==
The opening scene of the play shows a table inside the Omar Khayyám tandoori restaurant in Bradford, a converted Presbyterian church, where Harrison is holding a banquet with invited guests such as Omar Khayyám, Salman Rushdie, Voltaire, Molière and Lord Byron. Harrison appears sitting at the table drinking wine, expecting his guests and making a toast, in the name of Omar Khayyám, to Rushdie and all those who had experienced persecution on religious grounds. From the initial scene the audience is led to anticipate a feast.

Harrison introduces the places where his guests are expected to sit on "mirrored cushions" and also narrates the historical events surrounding each of the "blasphemers" using background imagery of political and religious events and demonstrations. Harrison also comments that blasphemy has historically been a function of time, mentioning that, in the past, Voltaire had been condemned by the French government but his works are now considered classics.

In the film, the historical figures are represented by actors or busts while Rushdie's chair is kept empty and he is the only guest who is expected to either arrive at the banquet in person or appear through a filmed interview from an undisclosed safe house location. In the end, Rushdie never appears, the expected feast never happens and the film ends with a silent blank screen. The music of the film was composed by Dominic Muldowney and the songs were performed by Teresa Stratas.

== Reception and analysis ==
Anthony Rowland writes that Harrison uses the five literary figures to represent literary culture and the Institution of Literature and its traditional opposition to the merging of religion with the state. Rowland mentions Harrison's choice of the Bradford restaurant which used to be a church, as symbolising the opposition of Literature to state religion by "occupying" a space used for religious purposes in the past.

John Gabriel comments that the film-poem's intent is to make clear that the Rushdie affair is connected to wider historical issues of censorship and the freedom to publish. According to Gabriel, Harrison makes this connection by "defiantly drinking an alcoholic toast to Rushdie in the company of four other blasphemers" at the Bradford restaurant and by the publication of his poem titled The Satanic Verses which was published in The Observer in which he writes:

I shall not cease from mental strife
nor shall my pen sleep in my hand
till Rushdie has a right to life
and books aren't burned or banned

== Reaction ==
The then-Archbishop of Canterbury Robert Runcie had been applying pressure to the BBC to postpone the broadcast of the film-poem. John Lyttle, the secretary for public affairs of the Archbishop, had written to BBC director-general Michael Checkland, on Runcie's behalf, expressing concerns about the impact the film might have on the Muslims of Britain. Lyttle had said at the time that neither he nor the Archbishop had seen the film and that they wanted to "resolve the Rushdie problem, not inflame it". Immediately after the programme's broadcast Runcie denounced it, saying that it could upset the Muslim minority of the United Kingdom.

The BBC replied to the Archbishop saying that "sensibilities surrounding the program had been considered carefully within the BBC and a great deal of advice had been sought on its content from both within and outside the BBC." Runcie was criticised by the Catholic Herald, which came to the defence of Harrison praising the BBC 1's Byline series as "excellent" and describing it as a series "in which distinguished experts put over a personal viewpoint on a current issue". The Catholic Herald also characterised Harrison's film-poem as fair and balanced and wrote that the Archbishop "should have held his peace".
