= Alexander von Warsberg =

Austrian diplomat and author (1836–1889)

- Born: Alexander Freiherr von Warsberg; March 30, 1836; Saarburg, Kingdom of Prussia
- Died: May 28, 1889 (aged 53); Venice, Kingdom of Italy
- Resting place: St. Leonhard-Friedhof Cemetery; Graz, Austria
- Occupations: Government official; travel writer

Alexander Freiherr [Baron] von Warsberg (30 March 1836 – 28 May 1889) was an Austrian government official and travel writer.

== Early life ==
Alexander von Warsberg was the eldest son of the Prussian chamberlain Baron Joseph Alexander von Warsberg and his wife Bavarian aristocrat Baroness Elisabeth von Wyttenbach. Soon after his birth, his father sold their family estates in Lorraine and moved the family to Graz.

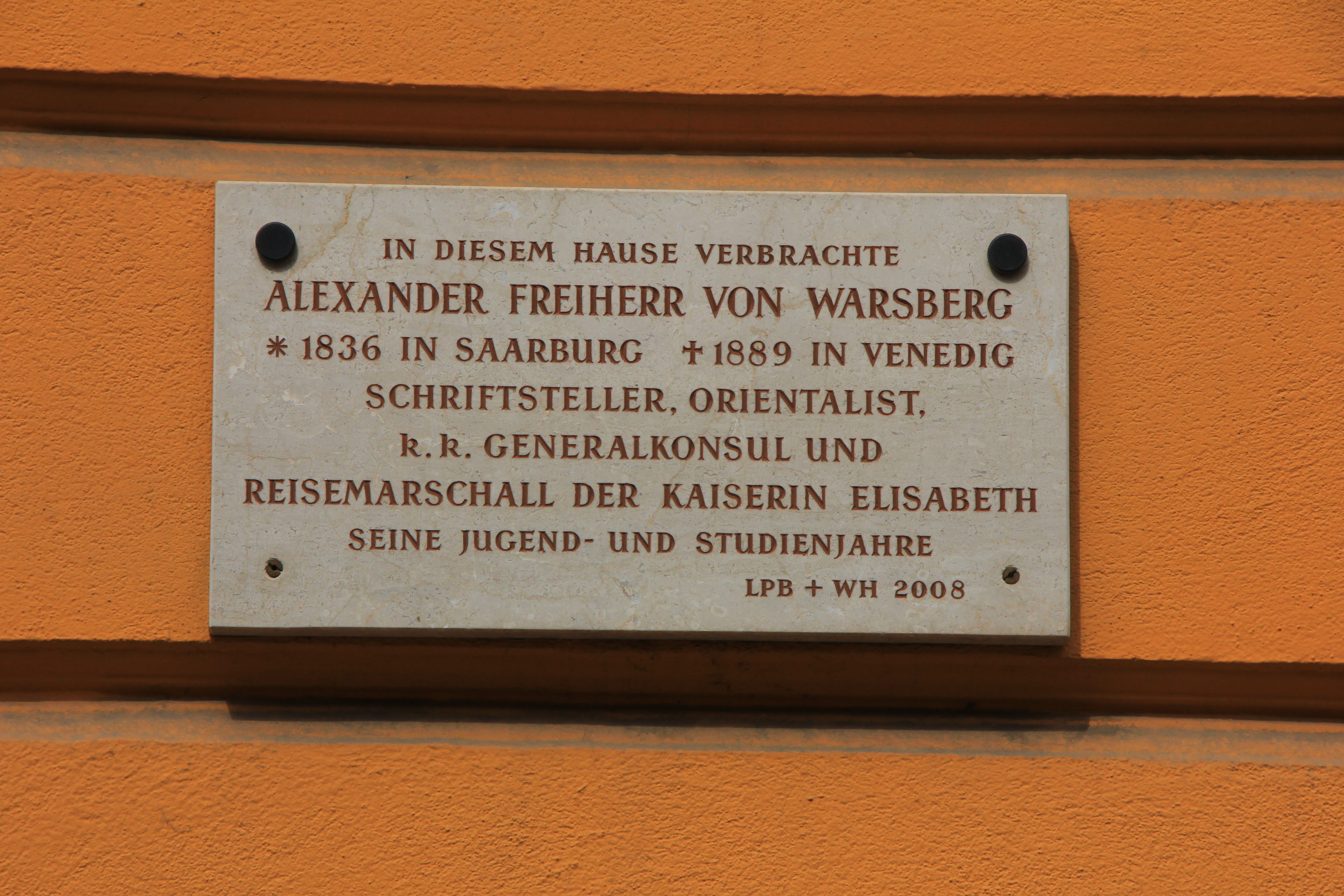
Memorial plaque on the house in Graz where Warsberg lived

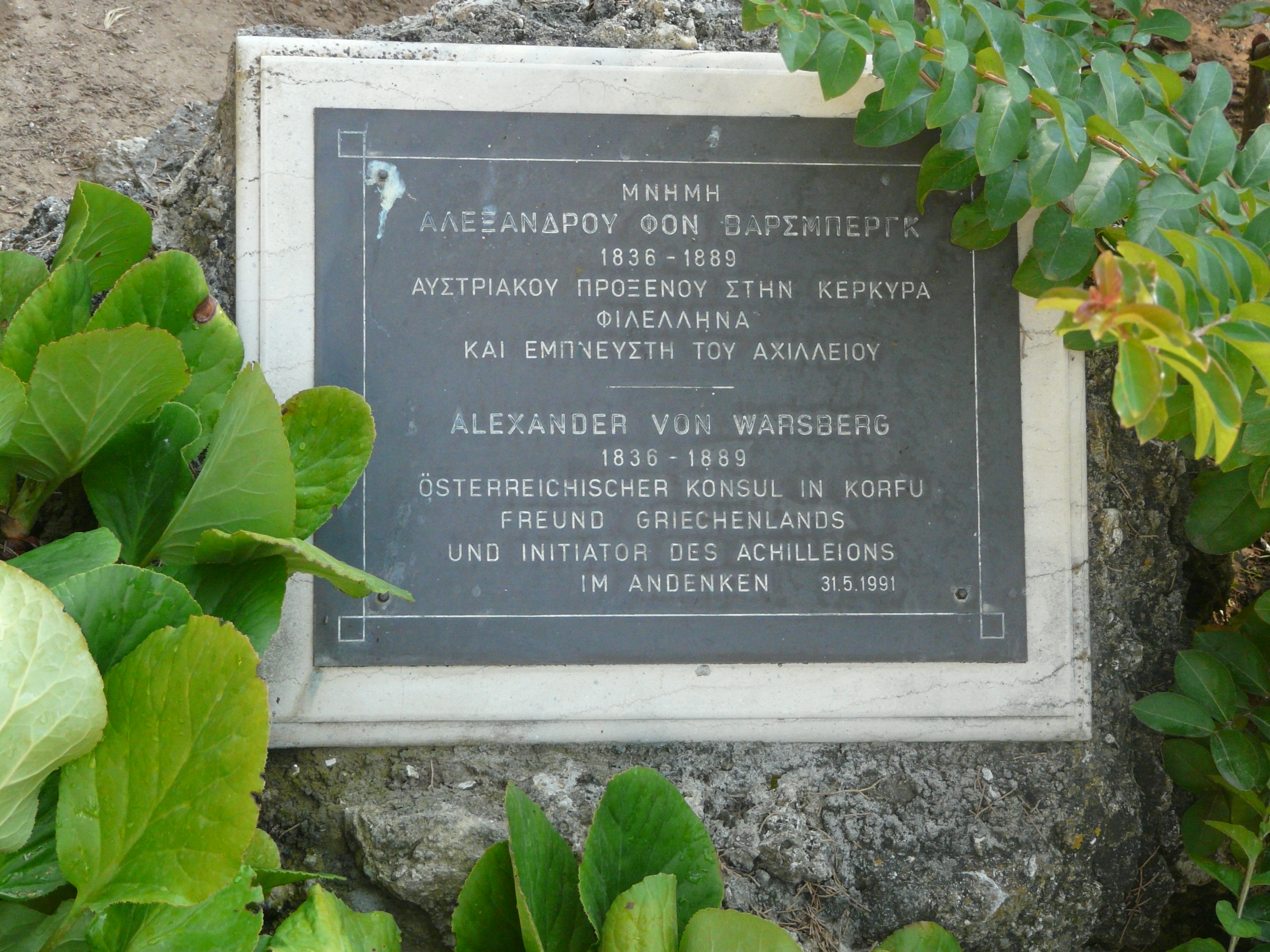
Commemorative plaque for Warsberg in the Achilleion

Warsberg attended gymnasium and university in Austria, and later joined the imperial royal civil service at the governor's office in Graz.

== Career ==
In 1858, he was transferred to the governorship in Venice where he worked until he was dismissed by Cajetan von Bissingen-Nippenburg in 1859. In 1868, 1869, and 1871, Warsberg visited Egypt. In 1870, he spent several months in Corfu. During the first half of the 1880s, he toured Attica, Thessaly, Epirus, the Peloponnese, and Libya.

In the beginning of the 1880s, Empress Elisabeth of Austria began to focus on Greece, likely inspired by Warsberg's Odyssey Landscapes. Empress Elisabeth contacted Warsberg, then the Austrian consul in Greece, and appointed him her "traveling marshal". In 1885, he accompanied her on a trip to Greece. Initially, Elisabeth did not leave a positive impression on Warsberg. He described the empress in his diary as "ugly, old, skinny-looking, ill-dressed". However, after their first voyage together, he changed his opinion of Elisabeth and began showing a certain affection toward her. In 1887 and 1888, Warsberg accompanied the empress on further strenuous journeys through Western Greece, Ithaca, the Peloponnese, and Asia Minor. However, his health was steadily declining and he often complained that the hardships as Elisabeth's "travel marshal" exceeded all his previous trips to the Orient.

In November 1887, the Empress commissioned Warsberg to find a suitable plot of land for a villa on Corfu. Warsberg, who was now seriously ill, managed to acquire the Villa Braila for the Empress and purchased additional land on Corfu for the construction of the villa. He created the "spiritual concept" for the palace, called Achilleion, but did not live to see the completion of it in 1891. After his death, his brother Gustav took over the construction management for a short time.

In the fall of 1887, Warsberg was appointed Consul General in Venice, but died in the spring of 1889 from a long-standing lung condition. He was buried in the St. Leonhard-Friedhof Cemetery in Graz.
