= Benitses =

Benitses Μπενίτσες
- Community
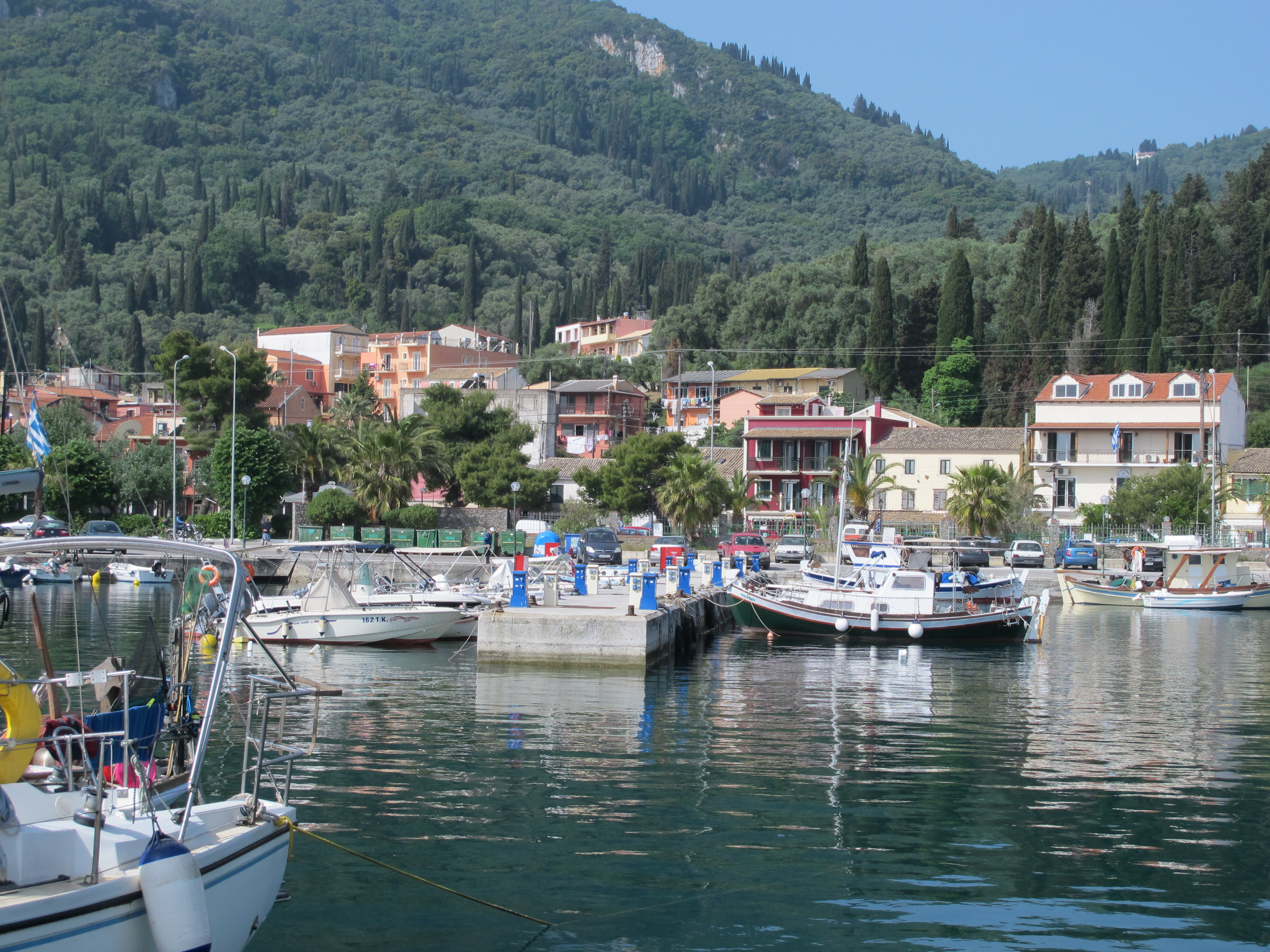
- Benitses harbour

- Location within Greece
- Coordinates: 39°32′36″N 19°54′50″E
- Country: Greece
- Administrative region: Ionian Islands
- Regional unit: Corfu
- Municipality: Central Corfu and Diapontian Islands
- Municipal unit: Achilleio

Population (2021)
  - Community: 630
- Time zone: UTC+2 (EET)
  - Summer (DST): UTC+3 (EEST)

== Location ==
Benitses, a quaint fishing village located 12 kilometres south of Corfu town, Greece, is nestled between the sea and the mountainous areas of Aghii Deka and Stavros. The village's name first appeared in historical records in 1469. The name "Benitses" is derived from the ancient Greek word "Pinio," indicating the confluence of streams in the area, historically referred to as "Pinisse".

Nestled between the Ionian Sea and the verdant hills of central Corfu, Benitses has a distinctive geographical setting as a seaside village with mountainous landscapes.

The village lies along a sheltered bay, which contributes to its calm and clear waters. This protected coastal environment makes Benitses an ideal spot for various water activities such as swimming, snorkeling, and boating. The beaches of Benitses are a mix of pebbly and sandy stretches, fringed by tamarisk trees and other Mediterranean vegetation, offering picturesque spots for relaxation and recreation.

== Population ==
Historical population
| Year | Pop. | ±% |
|---|---|---|
| 1991 | 697 | — |
| 2001 | 802 | +15.1% |
| 2011 | 843 | +5.1% |
| 2021 | 630 | −25.3% |

== Benitses in Recent History ==
During the Venetian rule of Corfu, Benitses was a small yet strategically important settlement. The village frequently faced attacks, particularly from Ottoman forces in the 16th and 17th centuries. Significant Ottoman assaults occurred in 1537, 1571, and 1716, each leaving Benitses in ruins and shaping its resilient character. Despite these challenges, the community persisted, focusing on agriculture, especially olive oil production, aided by numerous water-powered millstones by the early 19th century.

In the 20th century, Benitses played a crucial role during World War I when it hosted the Serbian army and government in exile. A temporary hospital was established in the San Stefano area to care for the wounded soldiers. The village saw further upheaval during World War II under Italian occupation, with significant impacts on the local community and infrastructure. The Vandoros building, a tall neoclassical structure at the entrance of Benitses old port, housed an Italian family during the occupation and later served as headquarters for the right-wing partisan group EDES after the war.

The post-war years marked a significant transformation for Benitses, especially with the arrival of the first tourists in the 1960s. The 1970s and 1980s were a golden era, with the region's nightlife and the iconic "Spiros on the Beach" restaurant becoming a hub for both locals and tourists.

== Tourism in Benitses ==
Tourism in Benitses has undergone significant transformation over the decades, evolving from a tranquil fishing village into a bustling tourist destination. In the early 1960s, Benitses began to attract its first wave of tourists, drawn by its picturesque landscapes, mild climate, and charming local culture. This period marked the arrival of numerous celebrities and affluent visitors such as Vivien Leigh, Laurence Olivier, and Paul McCartney, who were captivated by the village’s serene beauty and used it as a retreat from their hectic lives.

The 1970s and 1980s witnessed the golden era of tourism in Benitses. The village became renowned for its vibrant nightlife, epitomized by the famous "Spiros on the Beach" restaurant, which quickly became a legendary spot for both locals and tourists. During this time, Benitses gained a reputation as a hotspot for organized tourism, attracting young visitors seeking sun, sea, and lively entertainment. The influx of tourists brought significant economic benefits to the village, with many local businesses thriving on the tourism boom.

However, the surge in tourism also brought challenges. The rapid development to accommodate tourists led to environmental and infrastructural strains. In the 1990s and early 2000s, Benitses faced a decline in its tourist appeal due to over-commercialization and competition from other emerging tourist destinations. Efforts to revitalise tourism in the village included improving infrastructure, promoting sustainable tourism practices, and preserving its historical and cultural heritage.

In recent years, Benitses has developed as a tourist destination. The opening of accommodations, such as the Angsana resort in 2020, reflects a shift towards upscale tourism, attracting visitors seeking both comfort and local culture experiences. Benitses combines its historical character with contemporary tourism infrastructure.
