= The Labourers of Herakles =

- Original language: English and Ancient Greek
- Written by: Tony Harrison

Premiere
- Date: 23 August 1995
- Place: Delphi, Greece

The Labourers of Herakles is a 1995 play created by English poet and playwright Tony Harrison. It is partially based on remaining fragments of tragedies by ancient Greek dramatist Phrynichos, one of the earliest tragedians. Harrison's play deals with genocide and ethnic cleansing and uses Heracles's filicide as a metaphor for the unspeakable horrors of war and man's inhumanity to man.

Immediately after the 23 August performance of his play at Delphi Harrison left for a frontline assignment to witness the Bosnian War and write poems for the atrocities in an assignment commissioned by The Guardian. The proximity of the theatre of war to the Delphi location of the performance of his play and his preoccupation with his war-assignment are cited as reasons the direction and execution of his play were influenced by the war and its atrocities. The 1995 performance of the play at Delphi, Greece, took place at the construction site of the new theatre for the European Cultural Centre of Delphi.

The play was sponsored by the Herakles General Cement Company of Greece. It was produced in co-operation with the European Cultural Centre of Delphi and the National Theatre Studio as an entry at the Eighth International Meeting on Ancient Greek Drama which featured participants such as Tadashi Suzuki and Heiner Müller and is also known as the Delphi Drama Olympics.

== Plot ==
The play takes place on a specially constructed set of a building site built by the sponsoring cement company, which included nine cement mixers forming a circle and a 35-foot high cement silo featuring the trademark of the Herakles Cement Company of Greece; a dark profile of Herakles wearing the lion pelt on his head.

The play starts in modern times at the European Cultural Centre of Delphi presenting it as a modern construction site where Labourers are preparing to pour cement on the foundations of a new theatre at the Centre called the "Phrynichos Theatre". At first, concrete is being poured to create the orchestra of the new theatre but the chorus gets trapped in the cement. This is used as a device by Harrison to examine the interaction between the audience and the play. As the Labourers carry on their duties pouring cement, the Voice of the Silo delivers the only known extant ancient Greek fragment phrase from Phrynichos' play Alcestis referring to Herakles's epic struggle as he is wearing down the body of Death by wrestling with him:

σῶμα δ᾽ἀθαμβὲς γυιοδόνητον τείρει ("he wears down his fearless, limb-twisted body")

at which time a statue of Herakles starts rising from the construction site. Subsequently, Labourer 4 gets possessed by the Spirit of Heracles and goes into a "manic percussion solo" while Labourer 1 begins posing as Hercules arranging his shirt to look like Hercules's lionskin and placing his shovel in a similar manner to how Hercules is traditionally depicted as holding his club. Eventually Hercules's madness transfers to Labourer 1 who then destroys Hercules's statue attacking it with his shovel. He then opens-up two cement bags, as red and white tape starts flowing out of the opened bags, symbolising the guts of the victims. Subsequently, Labourer 1 opens-up two smaller cement bags, symbolising the killing of Hercules's two children, and then withdraws assuming the pose of Hercules.

In the play, Harrison stars as the spirit of Phrynichos, a dramatist who was persecuted during his time because he took a stance against those who tried to appease the invading Persian army. Further, Phrynichos was first among ancient Greek dramatists to draw inspiration for his plays from political and military events of his era. Harrison delivers a moving speech about war, genocide and man's inhumanity toward man. The timing of the play coincided with the events surrounding the ethnic cleansing in Bosnia. Harrison, however, casts doubt, during the performance of his play, on the ability of his art to illuminate the plight of the victims at Krajina or Srebrenica or to receive a responsive audience, a fact that he seems to emphasise in a self-deprecating way when at the end of Harrison's speech, as the Spirit of Phrynicos exits the stage, one of the Labourers loudly exclaims: "Who the fuck was that?".

The chorus of women during the play is represented by the cement mixers. In a scene of the play Hercules, while lying on his own funeral pyre, delivers a speech about the power of fire in a manner reminiscent of Harrison's treatment of the same theme during his 1998 film Prometheus.

In the play Harrison presents Herakles' "furor" as "racist rage" and the murder of his own children as "part and parcel of genocide" and ethnic cleansing. Harrison also wants to highlight Herakles's struggle with his own "destructive impulses which led him to the unspeakable murder of his own children".

Near the end of the play Labourer 1 gets stuck in cement and asks for his shirt to keep warm in the cold concrete. As soon as he gets his shirt he starts screaming as if his shirt just became the Shirt of Nessus, the poisoned shirt which killed Herakles. Harrison describes the scene as "the shirt of modern Europe's agony". Labourers 2 and 3 in unison then describe the shirt as having been made by the victims of the atrocities of the Bosnian War describing the victims of the ethnic cleansing:

Muslims that are mouldering in mass-execution trenches…The fingers of the raped girl who wove herself a noose…Sarajevo children his shells made amputees…The mother of the mortared mosque's dismembered muezzin, assisted by the convoys of the cleansed of Knin.

== Reception and analysis ==
Kathleen Riley writes that while at the Drama Festival the other works presented there were high-budget productions performed at the huge ancient stadium close to the Delphi sanctuary, Harrison's play was noticed because of its "modest scale, muscular language and rhythmic thrust" which made it a more "immediate" for the audience. Riley continues that Harrison was commissioned by The Guardian to write poems for the war in Bosnia and he left for his frontline assignment to Bosnia immediately after the 23 August premiere of his Herakles play at Delphi. The proximity of the location at Delphi to Bosnia and Harrison's preoccupation with his Bosnian war assignment are cited by Riley as reasons that Harrison's play and its direction were influenced by the brutal war theatre in Bosnia.

Oliver Taplin in his critique of the play mentions that the predominantly Greek audience gave the play a mixed review because they may have been "defeated by the characteristic verbal and dialectal virtuosity" of Harrison. He goes on to write that the play may have also been too complex thus not following Harrison's "admirable maxim" that: "the play should be self-sufficiently accessible, without requiring any homework or footnotes".

Lorna Hardwick mentions that in his play Harrison speaks about the power of art in "redeeming destruction":

… Phrynichos, who gave the theatre a start
in redeeming destruction through the power of art,
and, witnessing male warfare, gave the task
of mourning and redemption to the female mask
