= Gastouri =

Village in Corfu, Greece

Gastouri Γαστούρι
- Community
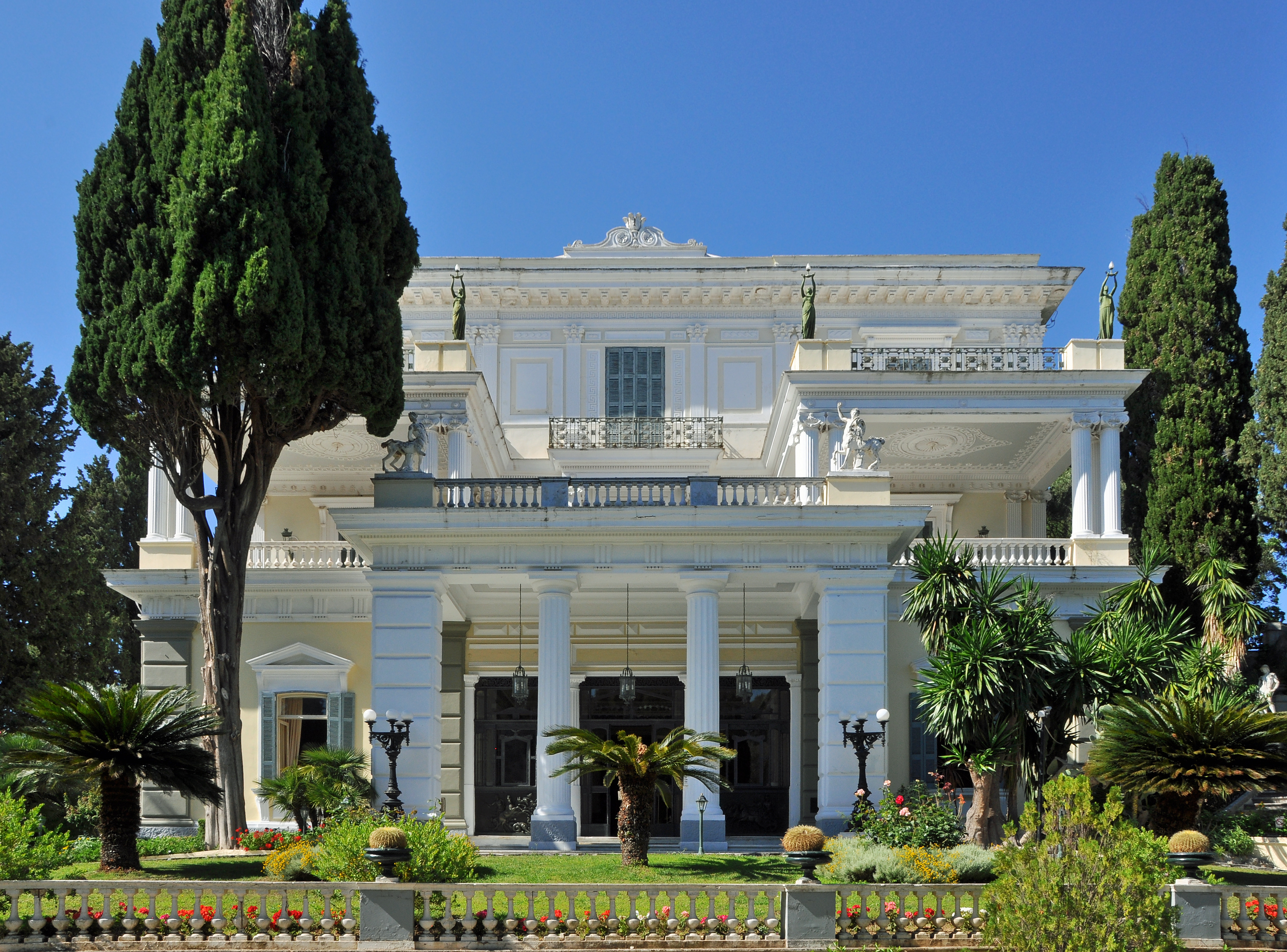
- Achilleion Palace, Gastouri

- Location within Greece
- Coordinates: 39°33′41″N 19°53′55″E
- Country: Greece
- Administrative region: Ionian Islands
- Regional unit: Corfu
- Municipality: Central Corfu and Diapontian Islands
- Municipal unit: Achilleio

Population (2021)
  - Community: 1,303
- Time zone: UTC+2 (EET)
  - Summer (DST): UTC+3 (EEST)

Gastouri (Greek: Γαστούρι) is a Greek village and community located about 10 kilometres south of the city of Corfu. Gastouri was established as a settlement on 28 January 1866 by publication of the decision in the Greek government gazette. In 1995, administratively, it belonged to the municipality of Achilleio. In 2019, it was removed from the administrative unit of the municipality of Corfu, and was transferred to the municipality of Central Corfu and Diapontia Islands. Gastouri is the location of Achilleion palace, built by Empress Elisabeth of Austria.

== Population ==
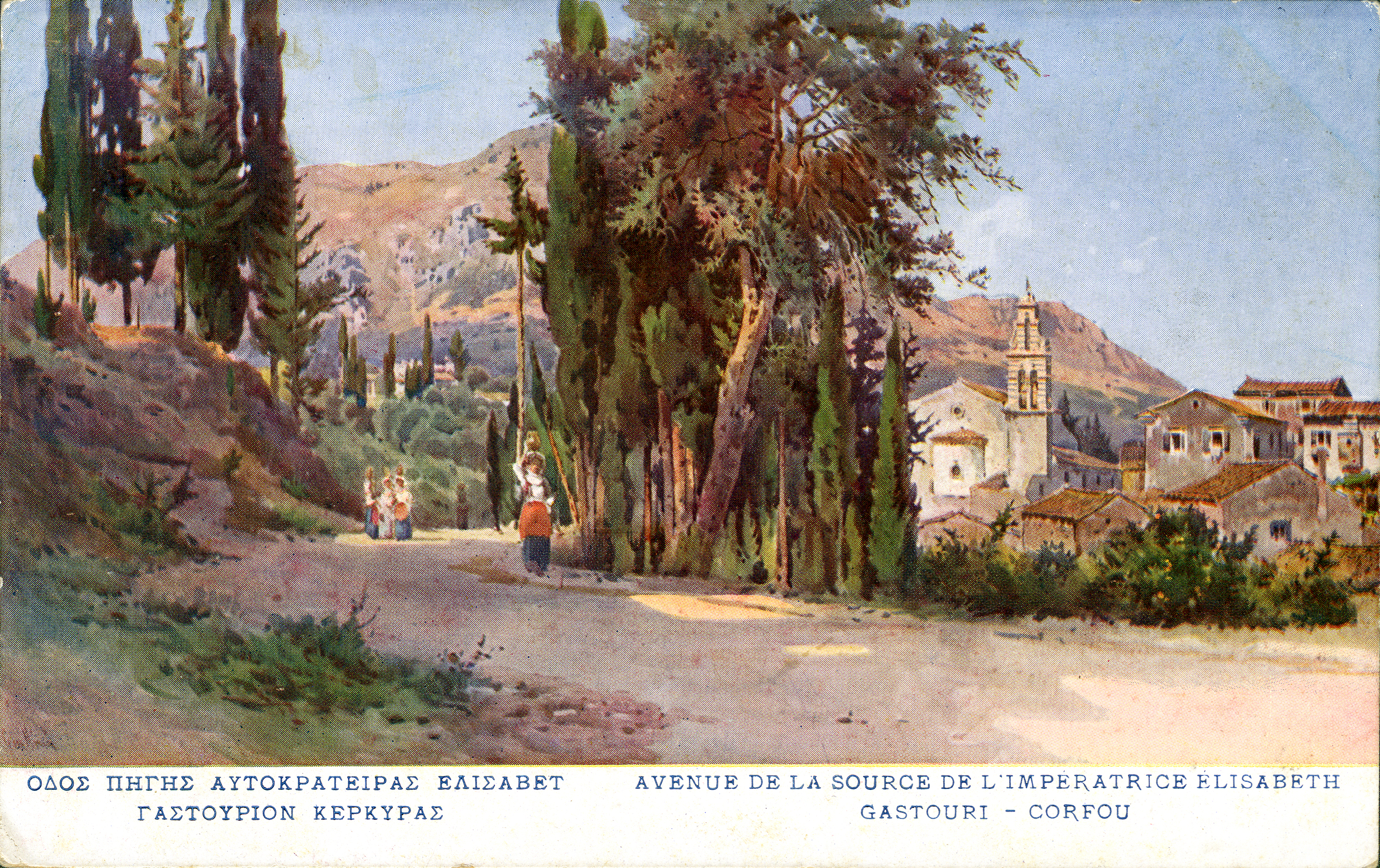
Postcard of a Gastouri street ca. 1910, based on a painting by Corfiote artist Angelos Giallinas and published by Aspioti-ELKA.

Historical population
Year	Pop.	±%
1991	1,148	—
2001	1,735	+51.1%
2011	1,700	−2.0%
2021	1,303	−23.4%
