= V (poem) =

1985 poem by Tony Harrison

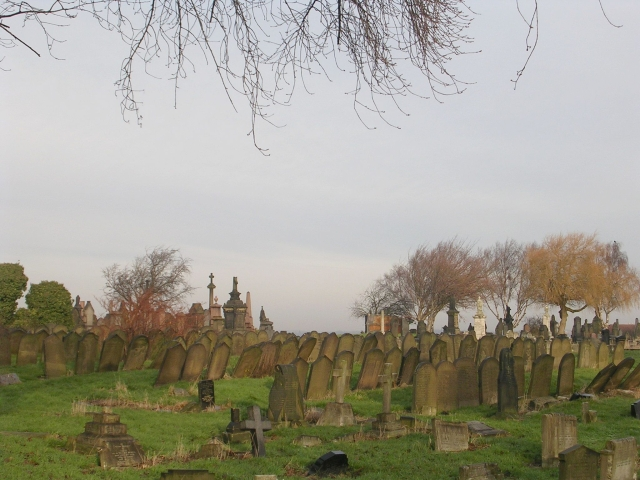
Holbeck Cemetery in Beeston, the setting for the poem.

"V" (sometimes styled "v.") is a poem by Tony Harrison written in 1985. The poem aroused much controversy when broadcast in film version on British public-service television's Channel 4 due to its extensive use of profanity and racial epithets. The poem uses profanity directly as well as when quoting graffiti.

== Premise and setting ==
"V" describes the author's visit to his parents' grave in a Leeds cemetery "now littered with beer cans and vandalised by obscene graffiti". The cemetery in question is Holbeck Cemetery in the Beeston area of Leeds which overlooks the Elland Road football ground, close to where Harrison grew up.

The poem gives a description of the graffiti on the grave, and pays particular notice to the use of the word united, exploring its ambiguous meaning, either as the name of a football club (e.g., Leeds United) or as the concept of unity.

"V" first appeared in the London Review of Books in 1985 and was first published in book form in November 1985 by Bloodaxe Books. The second edition, published by Bloodaxe in 1989, includes press articles relating to the media furore around the 1987 Channel Four film and commentary by Bloodaxe editor Neil Astley and the film's director Richard Eyre. The poem was also reprinted in the second edition of Tony Harrison's Selected Poems (1987), in later editions of that book, and in his Collected Poems (2007).

In 2025, the London Review of Books, with the encouragement of Tony Harrison, approached the south Leeds based theatre company Slung Low, about a live performance of 'v'. Harrison died on 26 September 2025 and the decision was made to go ahead with the performance as a unique celebration of the poem. On 12 October 2025 'v' was performed live in Holbeck Cemetery.

=== Political references ===
The poem was written during the 1984–1985 miners' strike, and makes reference to this as well as to National Union of Mineworkers leader, Arthur Scargill. It also makes reference to what the author calls "all the versus" (hence the poem's title) in life, and includes "communism v. fascism" and "Left v. Right".

== Broadcast and controversy ==
A filmed version of "V" was broadcast by Channel 4 on 4 November 1987. Prior to the broadcast, both tabloid and broadsheet press articles openly criticised the move. An early day motion entitled "Television Obscenity" was put to the house on 27 October 1987 by a small group of Conservative MPs. The motion was only opposed by one MP, Norman Buchan (Labour), who suggested that MPs had either failed to read or failed to understand the poem. In the midst of the controversy, The Independent published the poem in full in the newspaper to allow readers to judge the poem for themselves.

Conservative Party MP Gerald Howarth said that Harrison was "probably another bolshie poet wishing to impose his frustrations on the rest of us". When told of this, Harrison retorted that Howarth was "probably another idiot MP wishing to impose his intellectual limitations on the rest of us". Despite continued protests from conservative factions of the press and parliament, the broadcast went ahead, and there were very few complaints from viewers. Since then, the poem has been selected for study in some schools.

The BBC also broadcast the poem in full on 18 February 2013 on BBC Radio 4.
