= Yan Tan Tethera (opera) =

Opera by Harrison Birtwistle

Yan Tan Tethera A Mechanical Pastoral
- Opera by Harrison Birtwistle
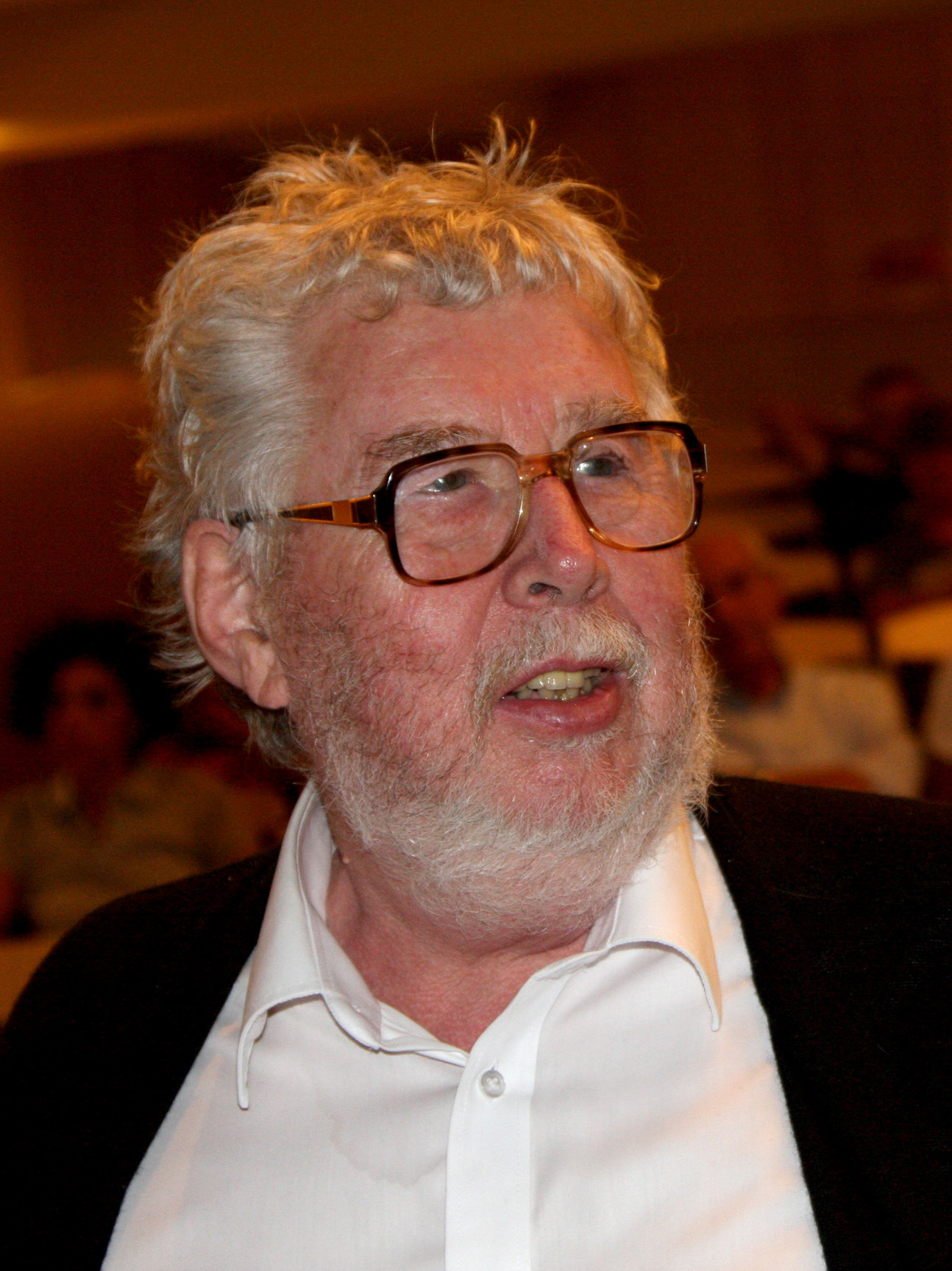
- The composer in 2008
- Librettist: Tony Harrison
- Language: English
- Based on: folk tale
- Premiere: 7 August 1986; Queen Elizabeth Hall, London

Yan Tan Tethera is a chamber opera (subtitled A Mechanical Pastoral) by the English composer Harrison Birtwistle with a libretto by the poet Tony Harrison, based on a supernatural folk tale about two shepherds, their sheep, and the Devil. It was first performed at Queen Elizabeth Hall, London, on 7 August 1986. The title comes from a traditional way of counting sheep.

== Roles ==
Role	Voice type	Premiere Cast, 7 August 1986 (Conductor: Elgar Howarth)
Alan	baritone	Omar Ebrahim
Hannah	soprano	Helen Charnock
Caleb Raven	baritone	Philip Doghan
Piper/Bad 'Un	tenor	Richard Suart

== Bibliography ==
- Adlington, Robert (2000): The Music of Harrison Birtwistle, Cambridge University Press. ISBN 0-52-102780-2
- Beard, David (2012): Harrison Birtwistle's Operas and Music Theatre, Cambridge University Press. ISBN 0-52-189534-0
- Cross, Jonathan (2000): Harrison Birtwistle: Man, Mind Music, Faber. ISBN 0-57-119345-5
- Hall, Michael (1984): Harrison Birtwistle, Robson. ISBN 1-86-105235-9
