= Tony Harrison =

English poet (1937–2025)

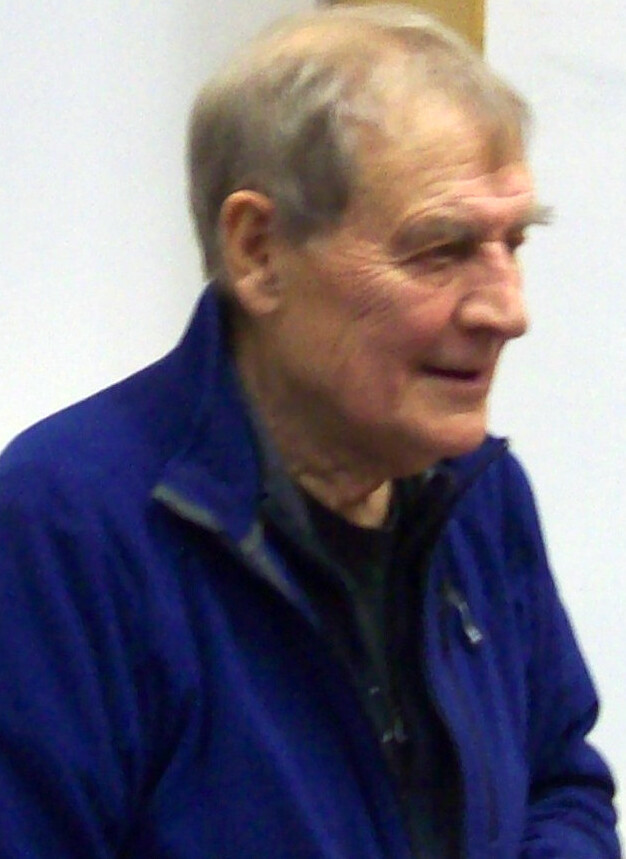
- Harrison in 2015
- Born: Tony William Harrison; 30 April 1937; Beeston, Leeds, England
- Died: 26 September 2025 (aged 88); Newcastle upon Tyne, England
- Education: University of Leeds
- Occupations: Poet, dramatist, librettist
- Spouses: Rosemarie Crossfield (m. 1960, divorced) Teresa Stratas (m. 1984, divorced)
- Partner(s): Siân Thomas (from the 1980s)
- Children: 2
- Writing career
- Period: 1964–2017
- Notable works: "V", Fram, Yan Tan Tethera, Prometheus
- Notable awards: European Prize for Literature (2010)

Tony William Harrison (30 April 1937 – 26 September 2025) was an English poet, translator and playwright. He was one of Britain's foremost verse writers and many of his works have been performed at the Royal National Theatre. He is noted for controversial works such as the poem "V", as well as his versions of dramatic works such as the tragedy Oresteia and the comedy Lysistrata from ancient Greek, Molière's The Misanthrope from French, and The Mysteries from Middle English.

Harrison was also noted for his outspoken views, particularly those on the Iraq War. In 2015, he was honoured with the David Cohen Prize in recognition of his body of work and in 2016, he was awarded the Premio Feronia in Rome.

== Biography ==
=== Early life and education ===
Tony William Harrison was born on 30 April 1937 into a working-class family in Beeston, Leeds. He was the elder child of baker Harry Ashton and homemaker Florrie (née Wilkinson-Horner) Harrison. He was a scholarship pupil at Leeds Grammar School, then read Classics at the University of Leeds.

From 1962 to 1966, he lectured in English at Ahmadu Bello University in Zaria, Nigeria. He then taught at Charles University in Czechoslovakia before returning to England in 1967.

=== Career ===
Harrison published his first book of poetry, The Loiners, in 1970; Loiner is an informal demonym, of unclear origin, for people from Leeds. Claire Armitstead, in his obituary for The Guardian, describes the collection as "exuberantly rude".

The Mysteries, his adaptation of the York and Wakefield cycles of English medieval mystery plays, was first performed in 1985 by the Royal National Theatre. Interviewed by Melvyn Bragg for BBC Television in 2012, Harrison said: "It was only when I did the Mystery Plays and got Northern actors doing verse, that I felt that I was reclaiming the energy of classical verse in the voices that it was created for."

One of his best-known works is the long poem "V" (1985), written during the miners' strike of 1984–85, and describing a trip to see his parents' grave in Holbeck Cemetery in Beeston, Leeds, "now littered with beer cans and vandalised by obscene graffiti". The title has several possible interpretations: victory, versus, verse, insulting V sign, etc. Proposals to screen a filmed version of "V" by Channel 4 in October 1987 drew howls of outrage from the tabloid press, some broadsheet journalists, and Members of Parliament (MPs), apparently concerned about the effects its "torrents of obscene language" and "streams of four-letter filth" would have on the nation's youth. Indeed, an early day motion entitled "Television Obscenity" was proposed on 27 October 1987 by a group of Conservative MPs, who condemned Channel 4 and the Independent Broadcasting Authority. The motion was opposed only by MP Norman Buchan, who suggested that fellow members had either failed to read or failed to understand the poem. The broadcast went ahead and, after widespread press coverage, the uproar subsided. MP Gerald Howarth said that Harrison was "Probably another bolshie poet wishing to impose his frustrations on the rest of us". When told of this, Harrison retorted that Howarth was "Probably another idiot MP wishing to impose his intellectual limitations on the rest of us".

Yan Tan Tethera, which premiered on 7 August 1986, at the Queen Elizabeth Hall in London, is a chamber opera (subtitled A Mechanical Pastoral) by the English composer Harrison Birtwistle with a libretto by Harrison. It is based on a supernatural folk tale about two shepherds, their sheep, and the Devil. The title comes from a traditional way of counting sheep. In 2014, it was revived at The Barbican as part of a series celebrating the composer's 80th birthday.

Prometheus is a 1998 film-poem, starring Micheal Feast in the role of Hermes, which examines the political and social issues connected to the fall of the working class in England, amidst the more general phenomenon of the collapse of socialism in Eastern Europe, using the myth of Prometheus as a metaphor for the struggles of the working class and the devastation brought on by political conflict and unfettered industrialisation. It was broadcast on Channel 4 and was also shown at the Locarno Film Festival. It was used by Harrison to highlight the plight of the workers both in Europe and in Britain. His film-poem begins at a post-industrialist wasteland in Yorkshire brought upon by the politics of confrontation between the miners and the government of Margaret Thatcher.

His play Fram received its premiere at the Olivier auditorium of the Royal National Theatre, London, on 10 April 2008. It uses the story of the Norwegian explorer Fridtjof Nansen's attempt to reach the North Pole, and his subsequent campaign to relieve the famine in the Soviet Union, to explore the role of art in a world beset by seemingly greater issues. The production was directed by Harrison and Bob Crowley and its cast included Jasper Britton as Nansen, Mark Addy as Hjalmar Johansen, Siân Thomas as Sybil Thorndike and Jeff Rawle as Gilbert Murray. The production received generally unenthusiastic reviews.

Harrison is also noted for his versions of dramatic works, such as Oresteia and Lysistrata from ancient Greek, Molière's The Misanthrope from French, and The Mysteries from Middle English. He was also noted for his outspoken views, particularly those on the Iraq War. In 2015, he was honoured with the David Cohen Prize in recognition of his body of work. In 2016, he was awarded the Premio Feronia in Rome.

In 2016, Harrison was interviewed by Ian McMillan for the BBC Radio 4 poetry programme The Verb.

=== Personal life and death ===
Harrison was married to Rosemarie Crossfield from 1960 until their divorce in the 1970s. They had two children. He remarried, in 1984, to the Canadian soprano Teresa Stratas. After his second marriage ended in divorce, his partner in later life was the actress Siân Thomas, who survives him.

In the early 1980s, Harrison spent time living in New York and Florida, before settling permanently in Newcastle upon Tyne. He died in Newcastle on 26 September 2025, at the age of 88. He had been diagnosed with Alzheimer's disease some years before.

== Reception and legacy ==
Harrison was one of Britain's foremost verse writers and many of his works have been performed at the Royal National Theatre.

Richard Eyre calls his 1990 play The Trackers of Oxyrhynchus "among the five most imaginative pieces of drama in the 90s". Jocelyn Herbert, famous designer of the British theatrical scene, comments that Harrison is aware of the dramatic visual impact of his ideas: "The idea of satyrs jumping out of boxes in Trackers is wonderful for the stage. Some writers just write and have little idea what it will look like, but Tony always knows exactly what he wants."

Edith Hall wrote that she is convinced Harrison's 1998 film-poem Prometheus is an "artistic reaction to the fall of the British working class" at the end of the twentieth century, and considers it as "the most important adaptation of classical myth for a radical political purpose for years" and Harrison's "most brilliant artwork, with the possible exception of his stage play The Trackers of Oxyrhynchus".

Professor Roger Griffin of the Department of History at Oxford Brookes University, in his paper The palingenetic political community: rethinking the legitimation of totalitarian regimes in inter-war Europe, describes Harrison's film-poem as "magnificent" and suggests that Harrison is trying to tell his audience: "To avoid falling prey to the collective mirage of a new order, to stay wide awake while others succumb to the lethe of the group mind, to resist the gaze of modern Gorgons".

Following his death on 26 September 2025, his obituary in The Times said, "The 'Bard from Beeston' had not only mastered the cultural heights but had produced a poetry touching people and places few others ever could."

In 2026, Tony Harrison was awarded a blue plaque by Leeds Civic Trust, which is placed on his childhood home, 120 Tempest Road, Beeston, Leeds.

== Bibliography ==
A full bibliography can be found here:

=== Poetry ===
- The Loiners (1970)
- From the School of Eloquence and Other Poems (1978)
- Continuous (50 Sonnets from the School of Eloquence and Other Poems) (1981)
- A Kumquat for John Keats (1981)
- V (1985)
- Dramatic Verse, 1973–85 (1985)
- The Gaze of the Gorgon (1992)
- Black Daisies for the Bride (1993)
- The Shadow of Hiroshima and Other Film/Poems (1995)
- The Bright Lights of Sarajevo (1995)
- Laureate's Block and Other Occasional Poems (2000)
- Under the Clock (2005)
- Selected Poems (2006)
- Collected Poems (2007)
- Collected Film Poetry (2007)
- Kumkwat dla Johna Keatsa, in Polish, Bohdan Zadura (trans.), Warszawa: PIW (1990)
- Sztuka i zagłada, in Polish, Bohdan Zadura (trans.), Legnica: Biuro Literackie (1999)

=== Pamphlets ===
- Earthworks (1964)
- Newcastle is Peru (1969)
- Bow Down (1977)
- Looking Up (1979)
- A Kumquat for John Keats (1981)
- The Fire Gap (1985)
- Anno Forty Two, Seven New Poems (1987)
- Ten Sonnets from "The School of Eloquence" (1987)
- A Cold Coming (1991)
- A Maybe Day in Kazakhstan (1994)
- Polygons (2017)

=== Film and television ===
- The Blue Bird: lyrics for George Cukor film (1976).
- Arctic Paradise: verse commentary for film in series The World About Us, producer: Andree Molyneux for BBC Two (1981).
- The Oresteia: translation for National Theatre production with music by Harrison Birtwistle, filmed for Channel Four television (October 1983).
- The Big H: musical drama, producer: Andree Molyneux, for BBC Two (December 1984).
- The Mysteries: adaptation of medieval English mystery plays for the Royal National Theatre, produced by Bill Bryden and Derek Bailey, filmed for Channel Four television (December 1985, January 1986).
- Loving Memory four poem-films, producer: Peter Symes for BBC Two.
  - Letters in Rock: (July 1987).
  - Mimmo Perrella Non è Piu: (July 1987).
  - Muffled Bells: (July 1987).
  - Cheating the Void: (August 1987).
- V: poem filmed for television, producer: Richard Eyre for Channel 4 (1987).
- The Blasphemers' Banquet: poem-film, producer: Peter Symes for BBC One (1989).
- The Gaze of the Gorgon: poem-film for television (1992). Examines the politics of conflict in the 20th century using the Gorgon as a metaphor. The imaginary narration of the film is done through the mouth of Jewish poet Heinrich Heine. Located in Corfu the film describes the connection between the Corfu Gorgon at the Artemis Temple of Corfu and Kaiser Wilhelm II.
- Prometheus: television film, also directed by the author (1998).

=== Plays ===
- Aikin Mata with James Simmons, Nigeria (March 1964). An adaptation of Aristophanes's Lysistrata.
- The Misanthrope, National Theatre Company (opened at the Old Vic on 20 February 1973). Adaptation of Molière's Le Misanthrope.
- Phaedra Britannica, National Theatre Company (opened at the Old Vic on 3 September 1975). Adaptation of Racine's Phèdre
- Bow Down (with Harrison Birtwistle), National Theatre (4 July 1977).
- The Common Chorus, (1988). An adaptation of Aristophanes's Lysistrata.
- The Trackers of Oxyrhynchus (1990). A hit play.
- Square Rounds, Olivier Stage (1992).
- The Labourers of Herakles (1995).
- The Prince's Play, National Theatre, London (1996). A translation and adaptation of Victor Hugo's Le roi s'amuse. The play was subsequently published by Faber & Faber.
- Fram, Royal National Theatre (10 April 2008).

=== Operas ===
- The Bartered Bride, translation into English of the opera by Bedrich Smetana, first seen at the Metropolitan Opera on 25 October 1978
- Yan Tan Tethera (libretto for Harrison Birtwistle's opera), (1986).

=== Works about Harrison and his poetry ===
- Astley, Neil, ed. (1991). Tony Harrison. Bloodaxe Critical Anthologies. Vol. 1. Newcastle upon Tyne: Bloodaxe Books. ISBN 1-85224-079-2.
- Spencer, Luke (1994). The Poetry of Tony Harrison. Hemel Hempstead: Harvester & Wheatsheaf. ISBN 0-7450-1588-3.
- Rutter, Carol (1995). Permanently Bard. Newcastle upon Tyne: Bloodaxe Books. ISBN 1-85224-262-0.
- Byrne, Sandie, ed. (1997). Tony Harrison: Loiner. Oxford: Clarendon Press. ISBN 0-19-818430-1.
- Sheehan, Sean (2008). The Poetry of Tony Harrison. Focus On. London: Greenwich Exchange. ISBN 978-1-906075-15-6.

=== Reviews ===
- Craig, Cairns (1982), Giving Speech to the Silent, which includes a review of Continuous: 50 Sonnets from The School of Eloquence, in Hearn, Sheila G. (ed.), Cencrastus No. 10, Autumn 1982, pp. 43–44, ISSN 0264-0856

== Awards and honours ==
- 1972 Geoffrey Faber Memorial Prize (for The Loiners, 1970)
- 1983 European Poetry Translation Prize (for Aeschylus's The Oresteia, 1981)
- 1982 Whitbread Prize for Poetry (The Gaze of the Gorgon, 1992)
- 1984 Elected Fellow of the Royal Society of Literature
- 2004 Northern Rock Foundation Writer's Award
- 2007 Wilfred Owen Poetry Award
- 2009 PEN Pinter prize, inaugural winner
- 2010 European Prize for Literature
- 2015 David Cohen Prize
- 2016 Premio Feronia

== See also ==
- List of British playwrights since 1950
