= The Gaze of the Gorgon =

- Cover of the book version of the work
- Written by: Tony Harrison
- Screenplay by: Tony Harrison
- Based on: The Gaze of the Gorgon book of poems
- Release date: 1992
- Country: United Kingdom
- Language: English

The Gaze of the Gorgon is a film-poem created in 1992 by English poet and playwright Tony Harrison which examines the politics of conflict in the 20th century using the Gorgon and her petrifying gaze as a metaphor for the actions of the elites during wars and other crises and the muted response and apathy these traumatic events generate among the masses seemingly petrified by modern Gorgons gazing at them from pediments constructed by the elites.

The verse-documentary is aimed at describing the "unspeakable horrors and atrocities of the twentieth century" through the Medusa paradigm and it was broadcast on BBC-2 in October 1992. According to literary critics, Harrison's work acts as a mirror through which the audience can gaze at the horrors without being petrified. The video-poem has been described as the "right lyre for the twentieth century".

The narration of the film is done through the mouth of a statue of the Jewish poet Heinrich Heine, which Kaiser Wilhelm II had removed from the Achilleion palace on Corfu after he took over ownership from Empress Elisabeth of Austria. The film describes the connection between Heine, the Corfu Gorgon and Kaiser Wilhelm II, who had an obsession with the Gorgon. Harrison has also published a poetry book based on the same concept. The book version received the Whitbread Prize for Poetry.

== Historical background ==
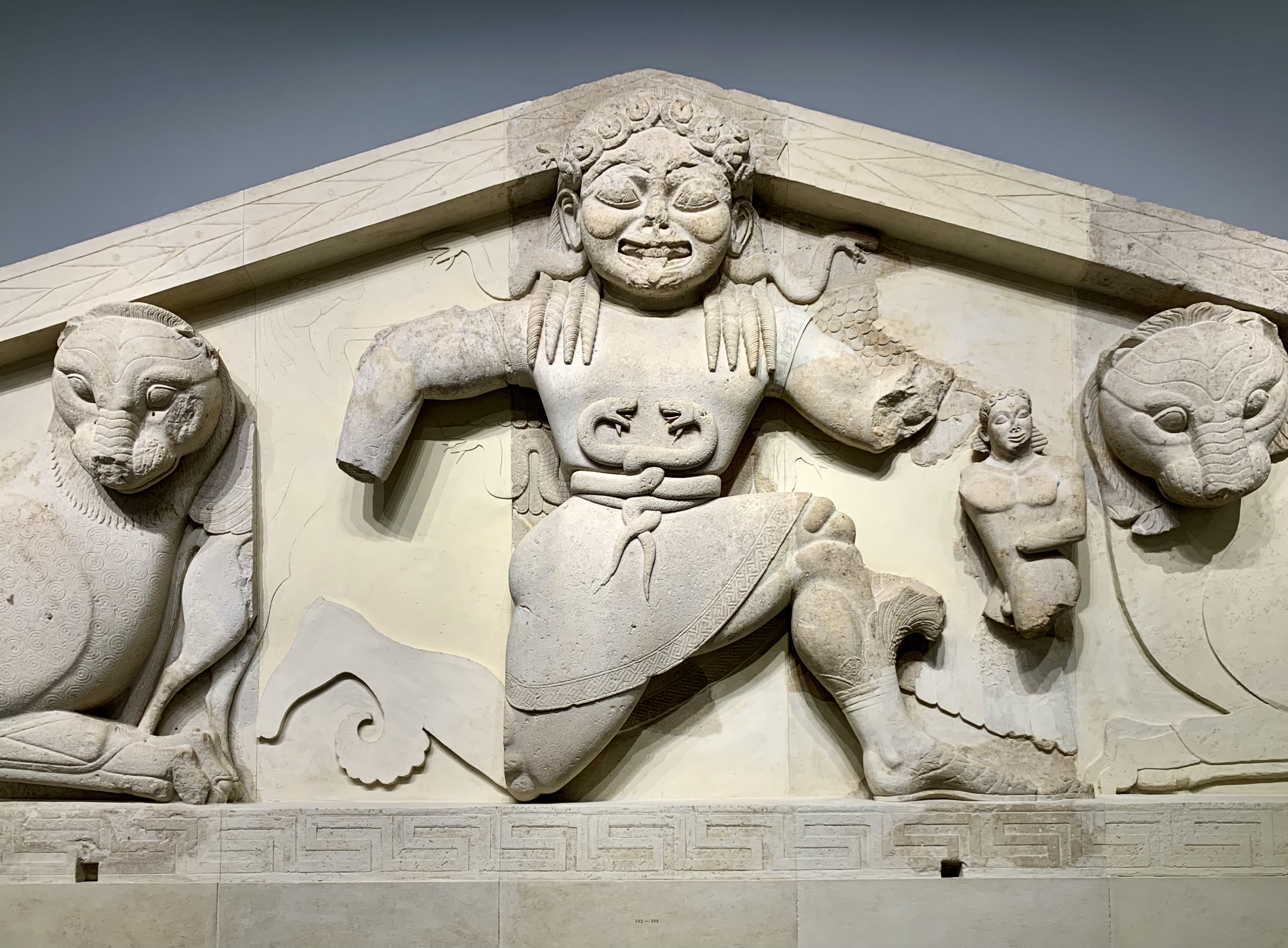
The Gorgon at the pediment of the Artemis temple in Corfu, a lifelong obsession of the Kaiser

Kaiser Wilhelm II had developed a "lifelong obsession" with the Gorgon sculpture which is attributed to seminars on Greek Archaeology the Kaiser attended while at the University of Bonn. The seminars were given by archaeologist Reinhard Kekulé von Stradonitz, who later became the Kaiser's advisor. The Kaiser, while residing at Achilleion and while Europe was preparing for war, had been involved in excavations at the site of the ancient temple of Artemis in Corfu.

In 1911 the Kaiser along with Greek archaeologist Federiko Versakis on behalf of the Greek Archaeological Society and famous German archaeologist Wilhelm Dörpfeld on behalf of the German Archaeological Institute, started excavations at the Artemis Temple of Corfu. The Kaiser's activities in Corfu at the time involved both political and archaeological matters. The excavations involved political manoeuvering due to the antagonism that had developed between the two principal archaeologists at the Corfu Temple site.

The Kaiser upon assuming ownership of the Achilleion also removed the statue of Jewish poet Heinrich Heine which Empress Elisabeth had installed at the palace because the Kaiser detested the Jewish poet whom he considered a democrat, and therefore a radical and a subversive.

Harrison has used these historical facts as background for his verse-documentary.

== Plot ==
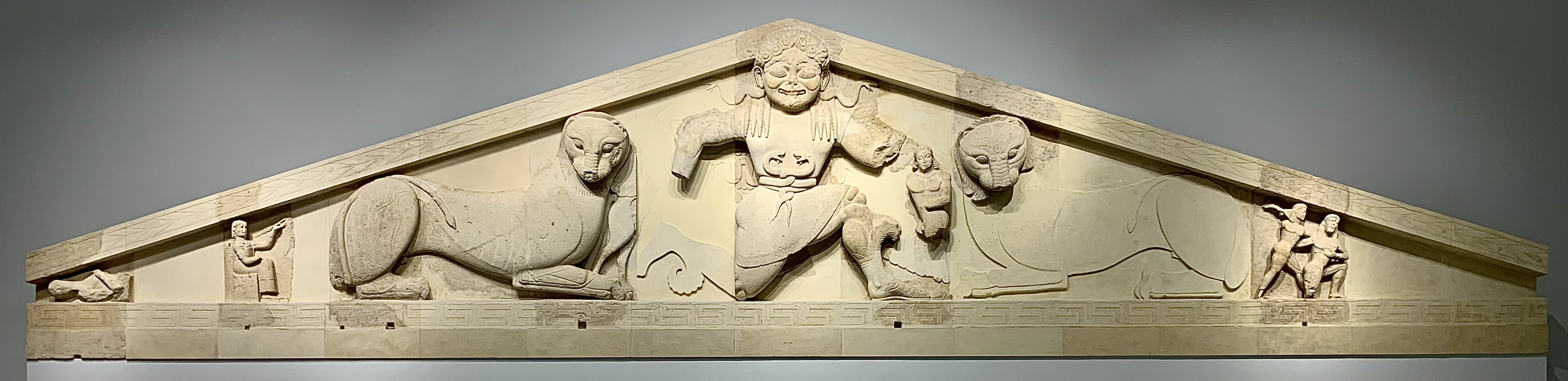
The full Gorgon pediment

In an article written for The Guardian Harrison stated that "Statues are one of the ways I try to test the traditions of European culture against the most modern destructive forces", and this is the reason why he used Heine's statue as the mouthpiece of The Gaze of the Gorgon.

In the film-poem, Harrison represents the Kaiser as a scholar archaeologist who is doing excavations in Corfu attempting to unearth the Gorgon pediment from the site where the ruins of the Artemis Temple of Corfu were situated. Harrison combines Heine's real-life predicament of having to leave from his homeland of Germany with the eviction of Heine's statue from the Corfu Achilleion and creates a common thread for his film-poem by having Heine's statue meander through Europe and moving from one European place to another delivering the narration of the film through the petrified mouth of Heine's statue. In the film, the narrative of the poem begins as follows:

...what was Kaiser up to? Excavating on Corfu, the scholar Kaiser on the scent of long lost temple pediment not filling trenches, excavating the trenches where the Gorgon's waiting there in the trenches to supervise the unearthing of the Gorgon's eyes.

Harrison uses the myth of the petrifying gaze of the Gorgon to analyse the common elements of the war-related atrocities of the twentieth century and to demonstrate that the war crimes of governments or the social failures of the capitalist system transcend historical time periods and they have the common element of turning individuals and societies to metaphorical stones as demonstrated by their apathy, inflexibility and intolerance. He then uses that metaphor to criticise systems and societies from Kaiser's time to the modern era. His criticism encompasses such wide-ranging events as World War I through World War II and the Gulf War. It also includes right-wing fanaticism and bigotry across Europe. At the end of the film, the wondering statue of Heine finally arrives at its final resting place of Toulon, France.

Harrison concludes his 1992 film-poem by making a proposal that in the 1994 European Union summit in Corfu, Heine's statue be returned to the Corfu Achilleion, where the European leaders held their meetings, in time to assume the presidency of the new Europe so that EU can keep its eyes open:

Soon, in 1994,
in this palace Greece starts to restore,
in this the Kaiser's old retreat
Europe's heads of state will meet,
...So to commemorate that rendezvous
of ECU statesmen in Corfu
I propose that in that year
they bring the dissident back here
and to keep new Europe open-eyed
they let the marble poet preside

== Analysis and reception ==
The book Witness and Memory: The Discourse of Trauma mentions that Harrison points to the muted response of the Western world to the traumatic events during the Gulf war as an indication of the petrifying effect of Gorgon's gaze. According to the book, Harrison contends that the paralysing effect of the gaze of the Gorgon brings about ghettos, genocide and gulags. The book also mentions that during the Gulf war the [Gorgon] pediments have turned to steel and the eyes of the Gorgon are the tank wheels which make all of "their devotees rigid staring at them from her temple frieze".

The book then compares Harrison's film to Primo Levi's work The Drowned and the Saved, where Levi makes mention of those who saw Gorgon and they were never able to return alive and calls them the "true witnesses" who could authentically testify as to the horrors of abuse as compared to those who suffered but at least were able to survive the extermination camps and whom he considers not true witnesses.

In the book Tony Harrison and the Holocaust, Harrison's film is called the right "lyre", i.e. instrument to describe the events of the 20th century and is viewed as a "bridge between The Holocaust and the Medusa". It continues that since Harrison chose the term "lyre" to describe his work, knowing that his work would be made for a television audience, it must be that he believes that only "television can draw a mass contemporary audience into a radical theatre of atrocity" and that his choice of the term also shows "his artistic self-confidence".

The Routledge Guide to Modern English Writing: Britain and Ireland mentions that Harrison's "televised long-poem produced in the wake of the Gulf war has shown that Harrison's energy and creativity are constantly developing" a fact which "makes him both accessible and exciting".

English Social and Cultural History: An Introductory Guide and Glossary mentions that Harrison has also been called "the Gorgon poet" because of this work.

Lorna Hardwick states that Harrison's work allows to gaze at the horrors without turning to stone ourselves, and that is his achievement as a "public poet". She mentions that Harrison uses the ancient Greek metaphors to create an art that can bring redemption by "holding a mirror to horror".

Canadian Poetry comments that Harrison "uses two monuments, an ancient "pediment…featur[ing] a giant Gorgon" and a "marble statue of [the] dissident German Jewish poet" Heinrich Heine to confront Kaiser William II's legacy to the twentieth century".

Robert Winder, literary editor of The Independent, comments that Harrison uses a "persistent and delicious mixture of high and low tones" to convey "the odyssey undertaken by the statue of the German poet Heinrich Heine" and finds it a "neat idea" because "the Gorgon turns even poets into stone".

Professor Roger Griffin Department of History Oxford Brookes University in his paper The palingenetic political community: rethinking the legitimation of totalitarian regimes in inter-war Europe calls Harrison's film-poem "magnificent" and comments that he is trying to tell his audience "to avoid falling prey to the collective mirage of a new order, to stay wide awake while others succumb to the lethe of the group mind, to resist the gaze of modern Gorgons".

Harriet L. Parmet in the journal for the Holocaust and Genocide Studies says that in his book Tony Harrison and the Holocaust, Antony Rowland has observed that "in The Shadow of Hiroshima and The Gaze of the Gorgon Harrison has articulated a response to the events of 1933-45".

Peter Robinson from the University of Hull, analysing Harrison's work, writes that Harrison in his film-poem follows Nietzsche's diction that "Art forces us to gaze into the horror of existence, yet without being turned to stone by the vision". By using his verse-documentary, Robinson continues, Harrison is trying to force his audience, through his art, not to turn away from the horrors and atrocities which would otherwise make them try to avoid and forget them. By doing that he is trying to make these events memorable through art and therefore help people not to forget the horrors and atrocities that are an integral part of their common memory and therefore essential to a life worth living.

Robinson writes that Harrison reaches his audience even when the viewers want to turn away from the TV-screen because they cannot bear looking at the horrors depicted. Harrison achieves this because of the continuing narration of his poem which reaches his audience through their ear, thus helping them, through his art, absorb the events and make them part of their collective memory. Harrison is inspired by the Greeks who through their tragic vision want to "always keep looking, keep singing".

Sandie Byrne writes that Harrison may be indicating a way out for Europe which might enable EU to escape the gaze of the Gorgon, but she remarks that even then it is only a tentative suggestion on the part of Harrison and depends on a statue assuming the EU presidency.
