= Film-poem =

Subgenre of film

The film-poem (also called the poetic avant-garde film, verse-film or verse-documentary or film poem without the hyphen) is a label first applied to American avant-garde films released after World War II. During this time, the relationship between film and poetry was debated. James Peterson in Dreams of Chaos, Visions of Order said, "In practice, the film poem label was primarily an emblem of the avant-garde's difference from the commercial narrative film." Peterson reported that in the 1950s, overviews of avant-garde films "generally identified two genres: the film poem and the graphic cinema". By the 1990s, the avant-garde cinema encompassed the term "film-poem" in addition to different strains of filmmaking. Film-poems are considered "personal films" and are seen "as autonomous, standing apart from traditions and genres". They are "an open, unpredictable experience" due to eschewing extrinsic expectations based on commercial films. Peterson said, "The viewer's cycles of anticipation and satisfaction derive primarily from the film's intrinsic structure." The film-poems are personal as well as private: "Many film poems document intimate moments of the filmmaker's life."

== History ==
David E. James and Sarah Neely are two academics who have sought to explore the relationship between poetry and film. James writes of the idea of the poet ‘In the modern world, poet designates a preferred medium; but the word also implies a mode of social (un)insertion. It bespeaks a cultural practice that, in being economically insignificant, remains economically unincorporated, and so retains the possibility of cultural resistance.’ Of Stan Brakhage, David E. James writes ‘The installation of the filmmaker as a poet had, then, both theoretical and practical components. It involved the conceptualization of the film artist as an individual author, a Romantic creator-a conceptualization made possible by manufacturing a tradition of such out of previous film history; and it necessitated a working organization, a mode of production and distribution, alternative to the technology, labour practices, and institutional insertion of Hollywood.’

Sarah Neely in her chapter Poetry in her book on Margaret Tait draws upon Maya Deren and her contribution to the Poetry and The Film: A Symposium event organised by Cinema 16 in 1953 and later published in Film Culture magazine to explore relationships between poetry and film and amongst other sources and quotes includes “As Maya Deren so persuasively argued at the Cinema 16 symposium, poetry is often concerned with capturing the invisible: an emotion in the object or thing, rather than the thing itself.”

In his essay Poetry-Films and Film Poems in Film Poems, William C. Wees differentiates between poetry-film using a film to ‘illustrate’ a poem, and film poems in which ‘a synthesis of poetry and film that generates associations, connotations and metaphors neither the verbal nor the visual text could produce on its own.’

== Examples ==
Examples of a film that fits in to the first is Manhatta (1921) by Charles Sheeler and Paul Strand using the poem by Walt Whitman, while in the second is Meshes of the Afternoon (1943) by Maya Deren and Alexander Hammmid. Film Poems was a touring programme of films exploring the relationship between films and poetry curated by film maker Peter Todd. It first screened as a one-off programme at the National Film Theatre London on 19th of February 1998 and would launch the following year as a touring programme at various venues supported by The Arts Council of England and the BFI Touring Unit (and would be followed by a further three Film Poems programmes all curated by Todd). The first Film Poems programme included two films by film maker and poet Margaret Tait which displayed the range and texture of her work with one film Hugh MacDiarmid A Portrait (1964) featuring the poet MacDiarmid reading his own work, while the other Aerial (1974) is without words and which author Ali Smith described as ‘a tiny poem’. Sarah Neely also writes of this film ‘For this film, Tait moved away from the inclusion of spoken word on the soundtrack: instead the film’s poetry comes wholly from image and sound’ emphasising ‘Aerial seems a perfect distillation of Tait’s idea of a film poem. Sophie Mayer in How British Poetry Fell In Love With Film said Margaret Tait created her largely self-made films where she lived and would be described as ‘the only British artist truly making film poems’.

== Other notable film-poems ==
- The Indian film Stark Electric Jesus (2014)
- The Blasphemers' Banquet (1989)
- The Gaze of the Gorgon (1992)
- Prometheus (1998)
