= Heidi Urbahn de Jauregui =

German literary professor and essayist (1940–2024)

Heidi Urbahn de Jauregui (5 March 1940 – 12 August 2024) was a German-French Germanist and essayist who was an emeritus Professor of German Literature at the Jean Monnet University, France.

== Biography ==
Heidi Urbahn de Jauregui came from an entrepreneurial family in Remscheid. After the basic studies (Philosophy, History, German) in Cologne, she moved to West Berlin. A medical condition ended her studies. Following her recuperation, she could "fulfill her desire to leave Adenauer Germany, something she had wished to do for some time."

She continued her studies in French Literature and German studies in Paris and obtained her Licence (French academic grade) at the Faculté de Lettres of the University of Montpellier.

It was not possible for her to take the necessary Agrégation (a required competitive exam in France) for a University teaching commission because the French authorities refused to naturalize her in spite of her fulfillment of the formal admission criteria. The reason was that her research involved close contact with authors in East Germany. She went to the University of Lyon in order to finish a dissertation on the poet Peter Hacks and to attain a doctorate. She then received the naturalization and took the Agrégation.

After the tenure, an academic position would continually be refused to her. In particular, no one accepted her argument that Peter Hacks was no East German dissident but a Utopian socialist with whom the East Germans did not entirely agree and support. Finally, she received a position as Maître de conférences at the Jean Monnet University.

Urbahn de Jauregui later lived in Montpellier together with her husband the Spanish Biochemist Juan Jáuregui-Adell, who researches in Montpellier at the CNRS. She died on 12 August 2024, at the age of 84.

== Work ==
Heidi Urbahn de Jauregui worked mainly on essays. She had the reputation of a well known expert of Germans and in particular Literature of East Germany. In her publications, she never followed academic rules. Her main interests were in the classics of German literature, in particular Goethe, Thomas Mann, Heinrich Heine and Bertolt Brecht.

She received the Heinrich Mann Prize of the Academy of Art in East Berlin in 1986.

== Friendship with Peter Hacks ==
De Jauregui saw in the East German dramatist Peter Hacks the legitimate foundations of the German classics and the descendant of Goethe, Hegel and Heine. She devoted her dissertation and many essays to his creative activity. From 1975 on, she personally visited him regularly and maintained a continual correspondence until Hack's death in 2003.

== Works on Heinrich Heine ==
A significant part of Heidi Urbahn de Jauregui's essays deal with Heinrich Heine's works. She presented the first comprehensive biography of Elise Krinitz, who was the Heine's last mistress, at the end of 2007 called "die Mouche."

== Publications ==
Heidi Urbahn de Jauregui: Zwischen den Stühlen : der Dichter Peter Hacks. (Between the Chair: the Poet Peter Hacks) Eulenspiegel-Verlag, Berlin 2006, ISBN 3359016572 Heidi Urbahn de Jauregui: Charlotte und Goethe - a Monolog (German: Charlotte and Goethe - a Monologue) In: neue deutsche literatur (New German Literature) 3/1998, Nr. 46, pp 144–153 (Essay of Heidi Urbahn de Jauregui to a piece by Peter Hacks)
