= Zur Geschichte der Religion und Philosophie in Deutschland =

1835 essay by German writer Heinrich Heine

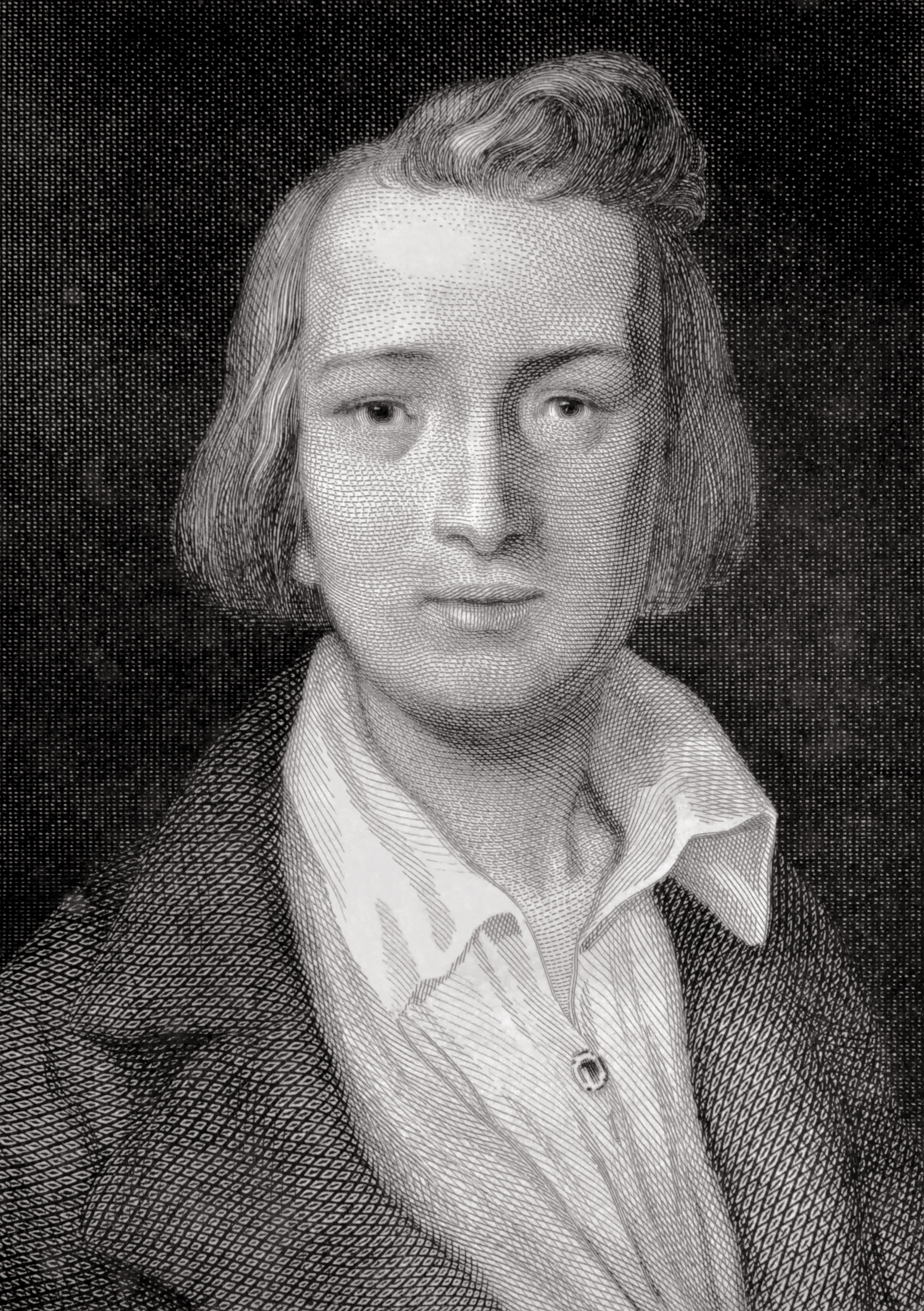
Heinrich Heine, engraving which appeared in Der Musenalmanach in 1837

Zur Geschichte der Religion und Philosophie in Deutschland (On the History of Religion and Philosophy in Germany) is a three-part essay by Heinrich Heine, each part referred to as a "book". He wrote them in exile in Paris in 1833/34. They were initially published in French, titled De l'Allemagne depuis Luther (Germany after Luther), in the magazine Revue des deux Mondes in 1834. The first publication in German was as part of Der Salon. Zweiter Band the same year.

Heine hoped for a revolution in Germany and looked at a history of emancipation in that country, beginning with the Reformation and followed by the philosophy of Kant and Hegel, among others.

== History ==
Heinrich Heine wrote the essay in exile in Paris in 1833/34, following the French July Revolution of 1830 and the German Hambach Festival of 1832. As it was being completed, Heine's German text was successively translated into French. The French text was published in three parts as De l'Allemagne depuis Luther (Germany after Luther) in the magazine Revue des deux Mondes in March, November and December 1834. The first publication in German was in the second volume of the literary magazine Der Salon (Der Salon. Zweiter Band) in 1834. Heine wrote in a preface for the German publication, dated December 1834, about the origins of the work, of the problems of the partitioned French publication, and of his intentions to present an overview of developments in German thinking, or mind processes ("Überschau deutscher Geistesvorgänge").

== Content ==
Heine addressed the French Revolution, missing a similar development in Germany. Stylistically, he often used contradictions in a dialectic way, citing the pairs "Körper/Geist" (body/mind) and sensualism/spiritualism, the latter in the meaning of his time. Heine criticises the philosophy of German idealism as thorough and deep but incomprehensible. His work is written in popular style, aiming at emancipation.

=== First book ===
Heine saw the Protestant Reformation as a first step to overcoming an effort to suppress the body in humans, aiming instead for the peace of body and soul ("Friede zwischen Leib und Seele"). He notes Martin Luther's denouncement of celibacy and his translation of the Bible as a means to make the book accessible for everyone and at the same time create a common German language. Heine called Luther's hymn "Ein feste Burg ist unser Gott" ("A Mighty Fortress Is Our God") the Marseillaise of the Reformation.

=== Second book ===
While Heine saw a religious revolution mainly as the work of one person, he regarded a "philosophical revolution" to be the result of thinkers such as René Descartes, Immanuel Kant and Georg Wilhelm Friedrich Hegel. They, and also John Locke, Leibniz, Spinoza and Lessing, form "geistige Familienbande" (spiritual family ties) that work, sometimes in contradiction, towards an improvement of philosophy. Heine distinguished between idealism, a theory of ideas, and materialism, which is derived from sensual experience. He opposed terms such as spiritualism and sensualism as polemic. He preferred pantheism to both a Christian and Jewish personal God and the atheism of the French Revolution, saying "Gott ist alles, was da ist" (God is everything that exists).

=== Third book ===
Heine appreciated Kant's philosophy, summarising: "Kant bewies uns, daß wir von den Dingen, wie sie an und für sich selber sind, nichts wissen, sondern daß wir nur in so fern etwas von ihnen wissen, als sie sich in unserem Geiste reflektiren" (Kant proved to us that we know nothing of the things as they are, but only know of them as they are reflected in our mind). He saw a "Verspätung" (delay) of the Germans in European history but expected nonetheless that a revolution would happen in Germany, late but forcefully.

== Legacy ==
Der Salon. Zweiter Band did not sell well, but the publication resulted in several bans in Prussia, Hamburg and Austria. Klemens Wenzel Lothar von Metternich, however, recommended the book as quintessential and in good style. The book foreshadows thoughts which later became topics of Friedrich Nietzsche, Sigmund Freud, Gershom Scholem and Walter Benjamin, among others.

== Cited sources ==
- Goetschel, Willi (28 January 2007). "Zur Geschichte der Religion und Philosophie in Deutschland [On the History of Religion and Philosophy in Germany]" (PDF). The Literary Encyclopedia. University of Toronto.
- Heine, Heinrich (1973–1997). Düsseldorfer Heine-Ausgabe (DHA) (in German). Vol. 8. Hamburg: Hoffmann und Campe. ISBN 3-455-03008-4.
- Heine, Heinrich (1970). Heine-Säkularausgabe (HSA) (in German). Vol. 8. Berlin: Akademie Verlag. ISBN 3-455-03017-3.
- Höhn, Gerhard (2004). Heine-Handbuch. Zeit, Person, Werk (in German) (3rd ed.). Stuttgart, Weimar: Metzler. ISBN 3-476-01965-9.
- Perraudin, Michael (2000). Literature, the Volk and the Revolution in Mid-nineteenth Century Germany. Berghahn Books. pp. 133–136. ISBN 978-1-57-181989-5.
- Voigt, Matthias (1 February 2017). "Heinrich Heines Lutherportrait in: Zur Geschichte der Religion und Philosophie in Deutschland". rezensionen-tiefenpsychologie.de (in German). Archived from the original on 25 October 2018.
- "Zur Geschichte der Religion und Philosophie in Deutschland". Projekt Gutenberg (in German). Der Spiegel. Archived from the original on March 3, 2015.

== Literature ==
- Heinrich Heine: Der Salon. Zweiter Band. Hoffmann und Campe, Hamburg 1834 (online at Google Books).
