= Jeanette Wohl =

Jeanette Wohl

Jeanette Wohl (October 16, 1783 in Frankfurt am Main – November 27, 1861 in Paris) was a longtime friend and correspondent of Ludwig Börne. She inherited the rights to his literary works after his death and edited his works. She is buried at Père Lachaise Cemetery in Paris.
