= Camille Selden =

German writer and literary critic (1829–1896)

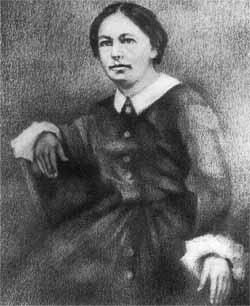

Camille Selden was the pen name of Elise Krinitz (1829–1896), a German-born author and literary critic based in France. She is best known for her role as secretary and companion to the poet Heinrich Heine in the last year of his life.

Born illegitimately in Saxony in 1829 to an Austrian Count Nostriz, she was adopted by a German family and named Elise Krinitz. She married a French man who spent her money and had her committed to an English lunatic asylum.

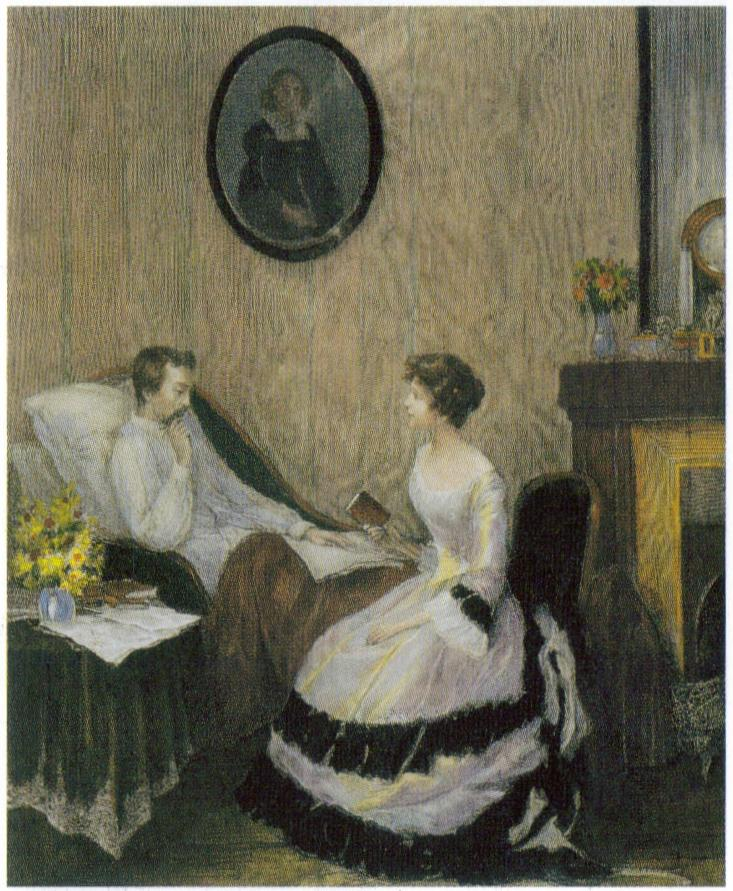
Engraving by Heinrich Lefler imagining Selden's time at Heine's bedside

In 1855, she introduced herself to Heinrich Heine as Margot, but because she sealed her letters with the sign of a fly, he called her ‘La Mouche’ (‘the Fly’). She carried out secretarial work for him and wrote at his dictation. Heine found her a comfort while he was dying, and she is the dedicatee of several of Heine’s last poems. She published Les Derniers jours de Henri Heine in 1884.

In the 1860s, Selden wrote several books including biographies, novels, and translations. She was supported by Hippolyte Taine, who praised her work, but she complained in her memoir that he had abandoned her unfairly. She also contributed literary criticisms to newspapers, becoming known as a French authority on foreign literature. In 1882 she accepted a post as Professor of German at the Lycée Jeanne d’Arc in Rouen.

She died in Rouen in 1896.
