= Ano Panta =

Region of Othoni island, Greece

Ano Panta Πάνω Πάντα
- Region of Othoni island
- Location: Othonoi, Diapontia Islands, Greece
- Settlements: List: Chorio; Dafni; Stavros; Argyratika; Damaskatika; Vintzentsiatika
- Demonym: Panopantitis (Greek: Πανωπαντίτης)
- Time zone: UTC+2 (Eastern European Time)
  - Summer (DST): UTC+3 (Eastern European Summer Time)
- ISO 3166 code: GRE
- Patroness: Virgin Mary (15 August)
- Website: diapontia.gr

Ano Panta (Greek: Άνω Πάντα) is one of the two regions of Othoni island, near Corfu, Greece. It includes the western mountainous villages of the island (Chorio, Dafni, Stavros etc.) while Kato Panta (Greek: Κάτω Πάντα) covers the central and eastern seaside part of Othoni.

Settlement	Region
Chorio	Ano Panta
Dafni (including Fragoplatika, Nikolatika and Mogiatika)	Ano Panta
Stavros	Ano Panta
Vitsentziatika	Ano Panta
Argyratika	Ano Panta
Deletatika	Kato Panta
Damaskatika	Ano Panta
Katsouratika	Kato Panta
Ammos	Kato Panta
Papadatika	Kato Panta
Mastoratika	Kato Panta
Kasimatika	Kato Panta
Benardatika	Kato Panta
Pagalatika	Kato Panta
Katsouratika	Kato Panta
Mihatika	Kato Panta
Avlakia	Kato Panta
