= Kato Panta =

Kato Panta Κάτω Πάντα
- Region of Othoni island
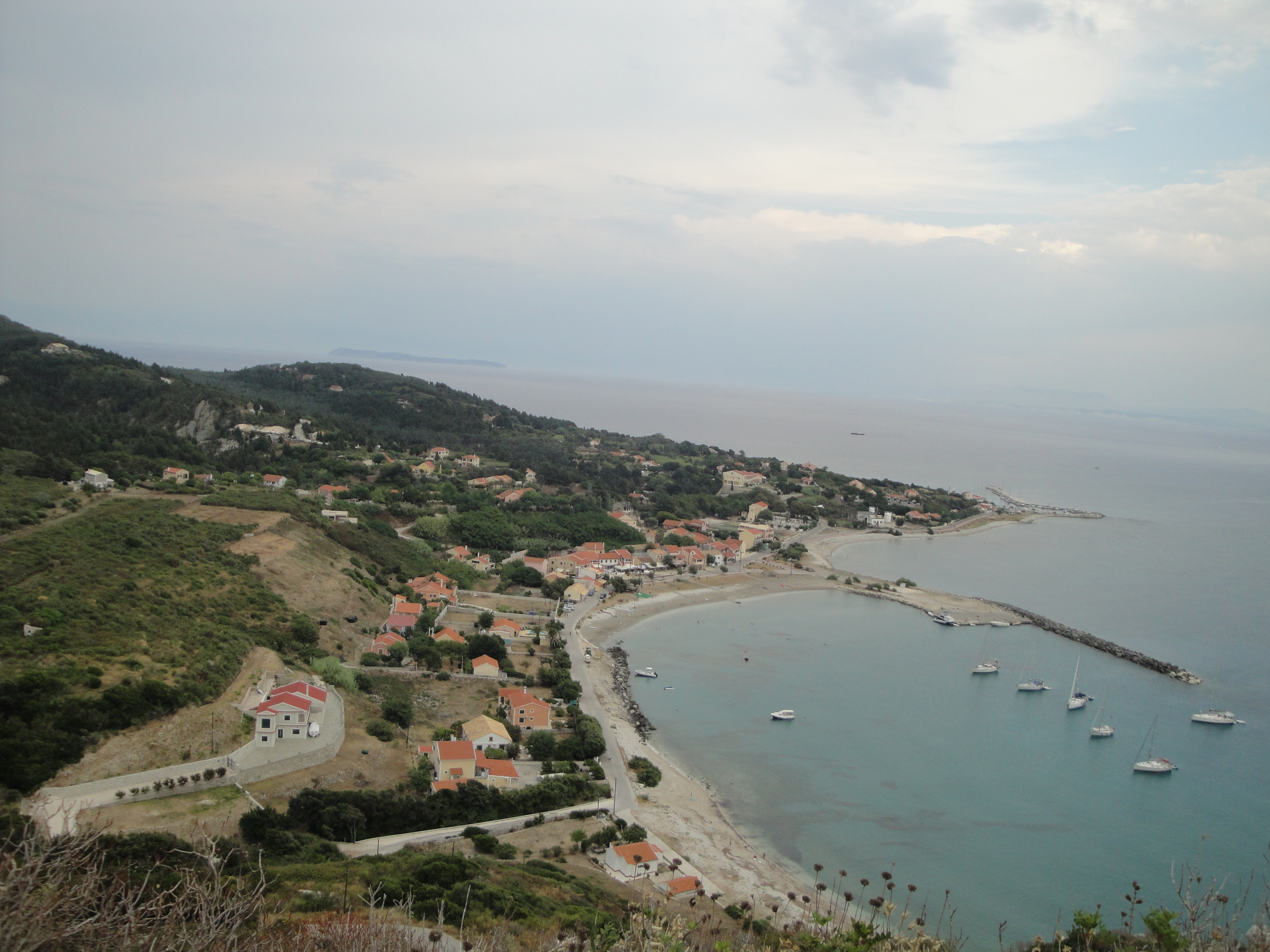
- Settlement of Ammos, Kato Panta, Othoni island, Greece
- Location: Othonoi, Greece
- Settlements: List: Ammos; Kasimatika; Mastoratika; etc
- Demonym: Katopantitis (Greek: Κατωπαντίτης)
- Time zone: UTC+2 (Eastern European Time)
  - Summer (DST): UTC+3 (Eastern European Summer Time)
- ISO 3166 code: GRE
- Patroness: Holy Trinity

Kato Panta (el: Κάτω Πάντα) is one of the two regions of Othoni island, near Corfu, Greece. It includes the central and eastern villages of the island (Ammos, Mastoratika, Kasimatika etc.) while Ano Panta (el: Άνω Πάντα) covers the western part of Othoni.
