= Katechis =

Katechis or Katehis (Greek: Κατέχης) is a Greek surname. The feminine form is Katechi or Katehi. It comes from the Greek noun katecho (κατέχω, "to own"). The surname's origin is Chorio, a settlement on Othonoi island in the Ionian Sea, Greece. It is also a common surname on Othonoi, Ereikoussa and Mathraki, the Diapontian Islands. Notable people with the surname include:

- Linda Katehi (born 1954), Greek-American engineer, Professor of Electrical and Computer Engineering at Texas A&M University
- Dale Katechis, former owner of the Oskar Blues Brewery in Colorado, son of James C. Katechis
- Anastasios Katechis, assistant professor in University of Athens
- John Katechis (born 1992), murderer in 2009 of George Weber
- Spyros Katechis, Greek-Egyptian military leader and spy during WWII
- James C. Katechis, Senior Executive Service (United States) ASMDA Wall of Honor Recipient
- Christos Katechis, key partner in telecommunications matters in NASA mission Apollo 11.
- Nia Katechis Terezakis, New Orleans Dermatologist, creator of green cream, past president of the Women's Dermatology Society, and recipient of the Dermatology Foundations's highest recognition, The Finnerud Award
