= Damaskatika =

Damaskatika Δαμασκάτικα
- Settlement
- Location within Greece
- Country: Greece
- Geographic region: Ionian Islands
- Administrative region: Corfu
- Regional unit: Diapontia Islands
- Demonym: Damaskatis
- Time zone: UTC+2 (EET)
  - Summer (DST): UTC+3 (EEST)
- Postal codes: 49100
- Telephone: +30 26630
- Vehicle registration: KY
- Patroness: Virgin Mary (15 August)
- Patroness: Saint Paraskevi (26 July)
- Website: www.diapontia.gr

Damaskatika (Greek: Δαμασκάτικα) is a settlement on the island of Othonoi, Greece. At Damaskatika is the Orthodox church of Saint Paraskevi and the Old Mill. Damaskatika is 1.2 km from Fyki Bay and 3,8 km from Ammos.
