= Imerovigli, Othoni =

Mountain on the island of Othoni, Greece

Imerovigli
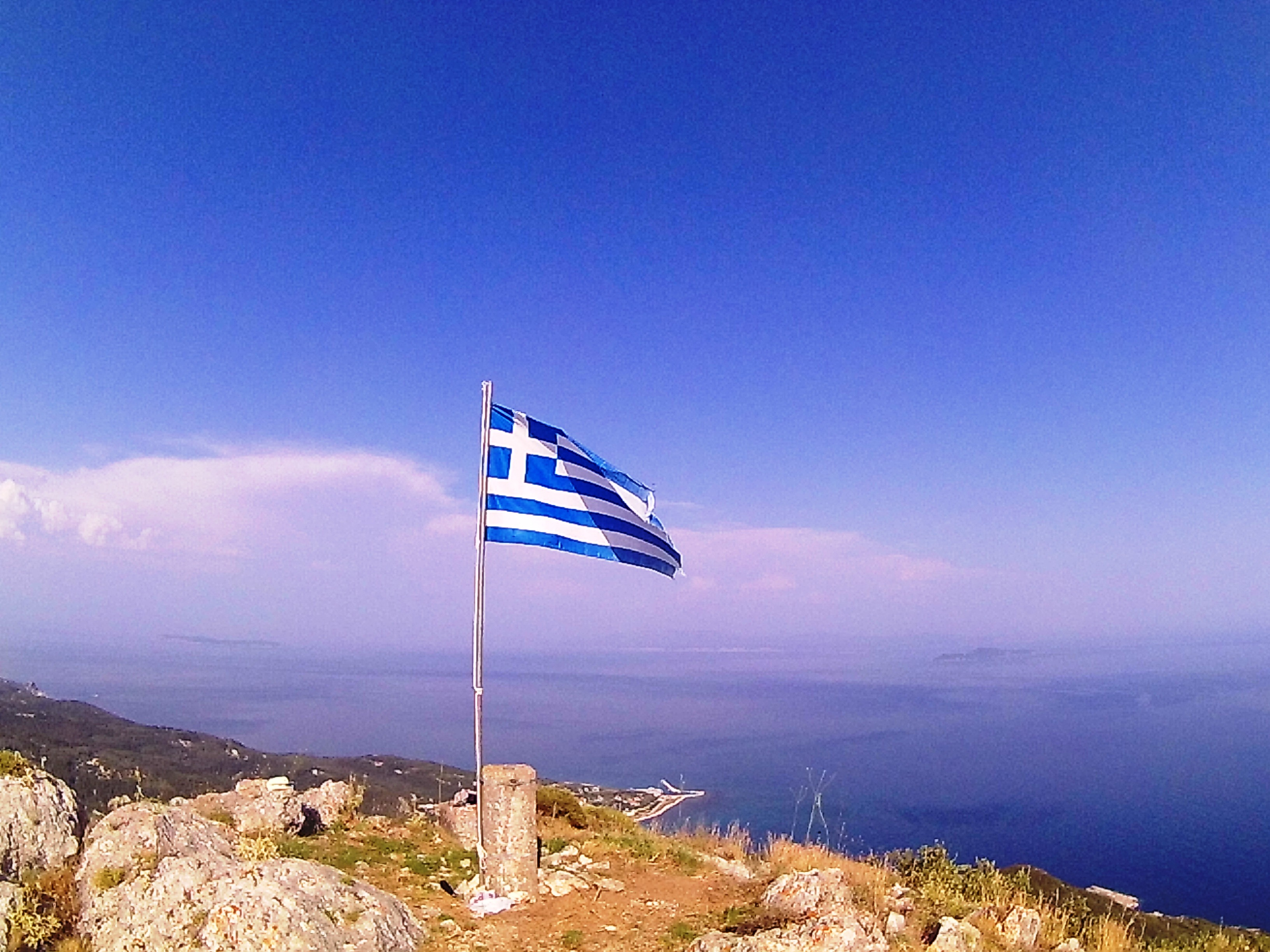
- Imerovigli highest peak

Highest point
- Elevation: 393 m (1,289 ft)
- Coordinates: 39°50′42″N 19°23′15″E

Naming
- Native name: Ημεροβίγλι

Geography
- Location within Greece
- Location: Location of Imerovigli on Othonoi island, Greece
- Parent range: Ano panta, Othoni

Imerovigli (Greek: Ημεροβίγλι; also Merovingli, Greek: Μεροβίγγλι) is the highest mountain of the Greek island Othoni, located in the Diapontia Islands in Ionian Sea, northwest of Corfu. It is about 1,3 km from the settlement Chorio. It has a height that exceeds 390 meters and is accessible by a traditional path (~ 1100 meters long) leading to the top of the mountain where every visitor can observe the view of the Ionian and Adriatic sea.
