= Chorio, Othonoi =

Chorio Χωριό
- Settlement
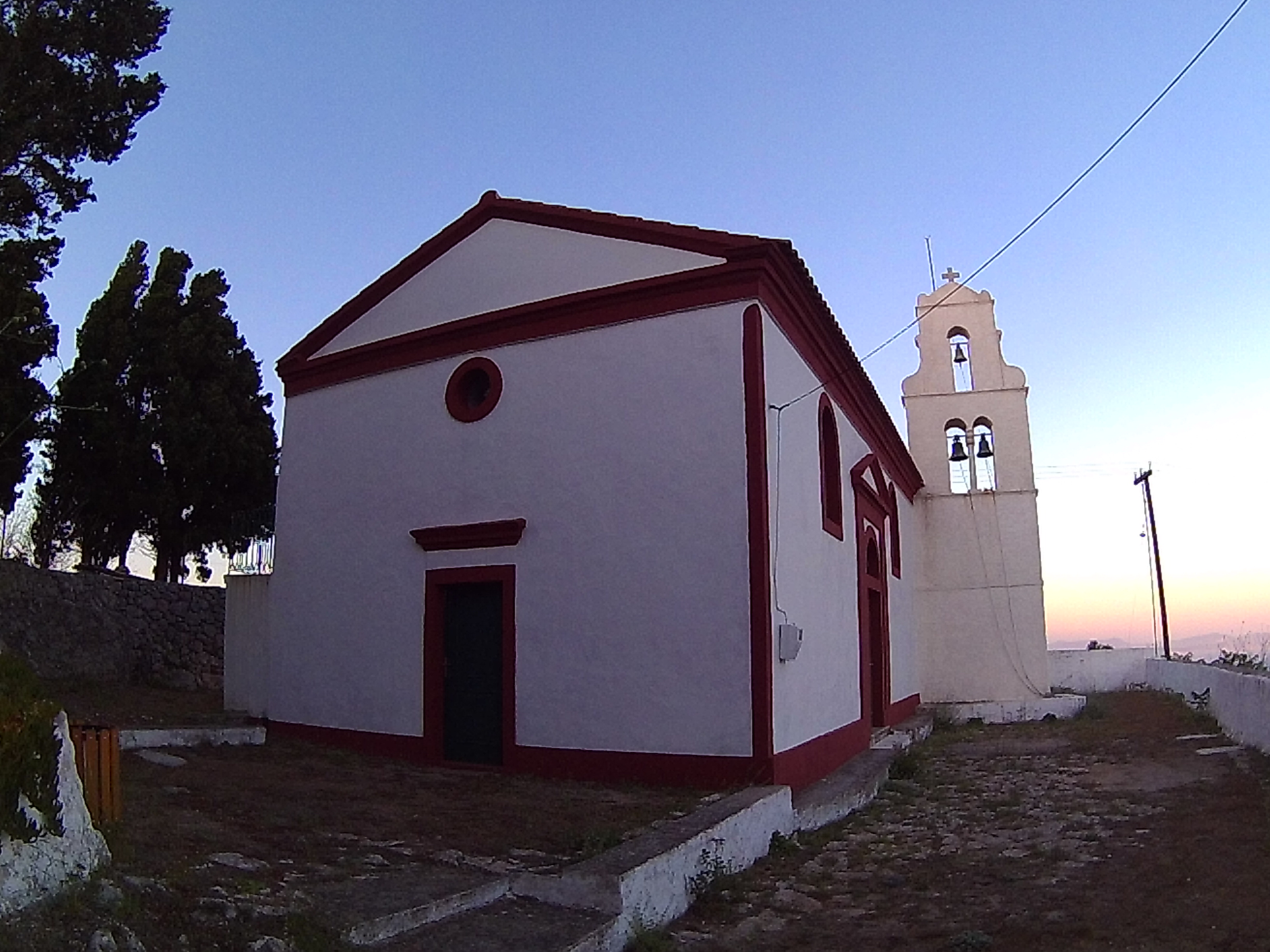
- Saint George Greek orthodox church of Chorio
- Nickname: Η Πρωτεύουσα (The Capital)
- Location within Greece
- Coordinates: 39°51′14″N 19°22′55″E
- Country: Greece
- Administrative region: Ionian Islands
- Regional unit: Corfu
- Municipality: Central Corfu and Diapontian Islands
- Municipal unit: Othonoi
- Highest elevation: 300 m (980 ft)

Population (2021)
  - Total: 26
- Time zone: UTC+2 (EET)
  - Summer (DST): UTC+3 (EEST)
- Postal code: 49150
- Area code: +30 26630
- Vehicle registration: KY
- Patron: Saint George
- Website: diapontia.gr

Chorio or Horio (Greek: Χωριό) is a village in Ano Panta region, on the island of Othoni and it is the westernmost point of Greece. It was the first settlement and the unofficial capital of the island. At the top of the Chorio hill is the Saint George Orthodox church (built in 1864). Chorio is about 7 kilometres away from the port of the island, Ammos and about 2 kilometres on foot from Imerovigli the highest peak of the island.

== Designation ==
The settlement was called "Chorio" (English: village) because it was a densely populated area at the time. At the beginning of its existence there were not any other settlements on the island. This name continues until today.

Chorio is also called "The Capital of Othonoi" (Greek: Η Πρωτεύουσα των Οθωνών)

The demonym of the locals is Chorianos - plural: Choriani (Greek: Χωριανός - Χωριανοί). All of them have the same surname (Katechis) as they are relatives.

== History ==
The first settlers of Othoni came from Paxos and Epirus in the 16 century, and decided to build their homes at this point of the island because of the protection it offered from pirate attacks, being the only place out of sight from the sea.

The main work of the villagers was the olive and oil production as some of them had private oil presses next to their homes. Many of the male population of Chorio were seamen (captains, engineers etc.).

== Visitor attractions ==
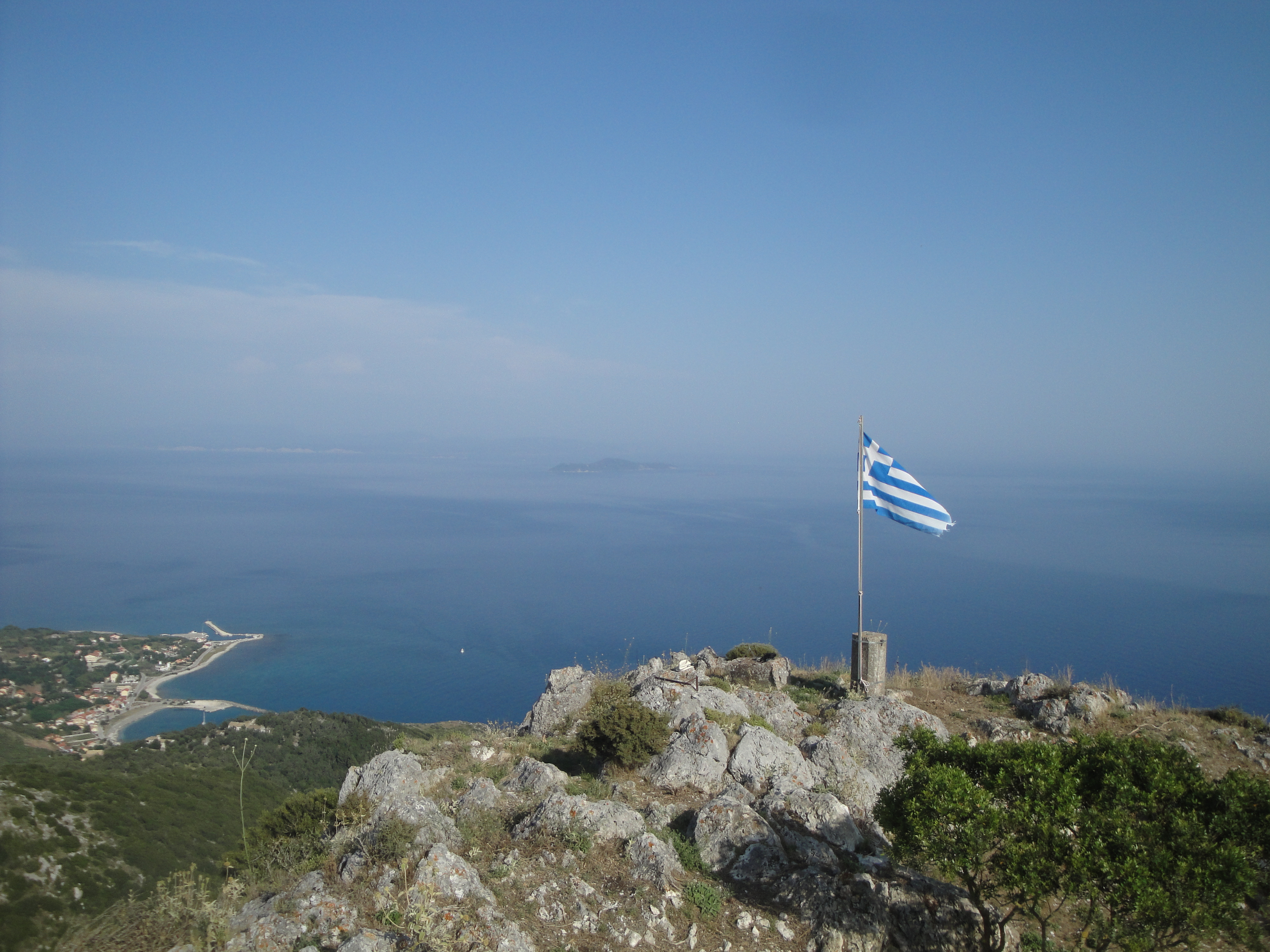
At the top of Othoni, Imerovigli

The houses of Chorio are traditionally made with stone walls and ceramic roofs and they have a lot of similarities with the Corfiat traditional architecture although do not share the Venetian style. They rather tend to relate to the Epirus traditional architectural type. Each of them is close to each other as all the owners are relatives.

The orthodox church of Saint George was built in 18th century at the highest peak of Chorio hill, where everyone can enjoy the view of the other parts of the island, Corfu, Ereikoussa, Mathraki and Ionian sea. Plenty of visitors and locals are visiting the highest peak of Othoni, Imerovigli (392m height) which is about 2km on foot from the settlement. Its trail is reopened by private initiatives of "Choriani" and other locals.

Another place is "Iliovasilema" (sunset) which is about 200m from Chorio with the view of Adriatic Sea.

== Gallery ==
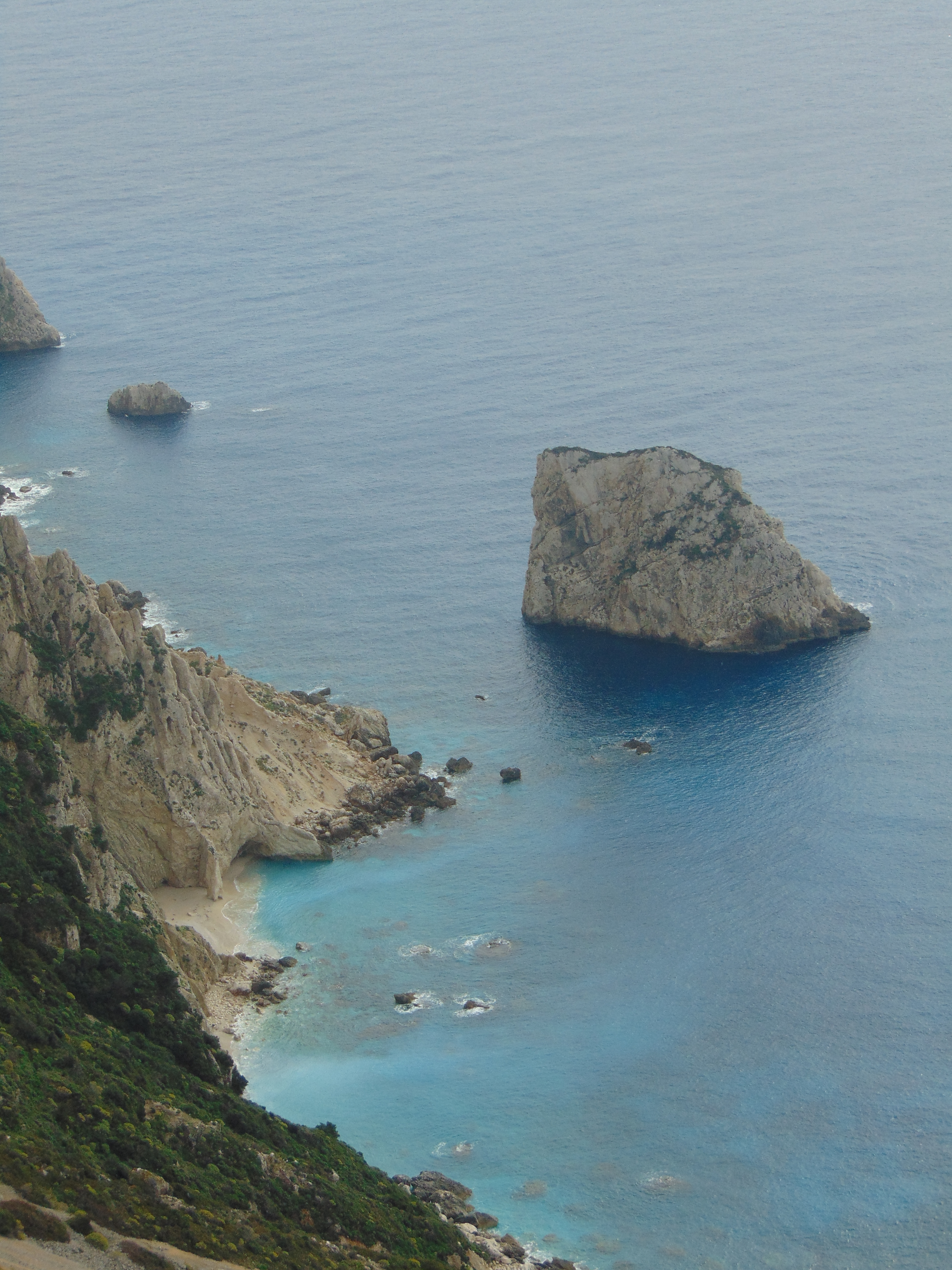
Koukouli rock

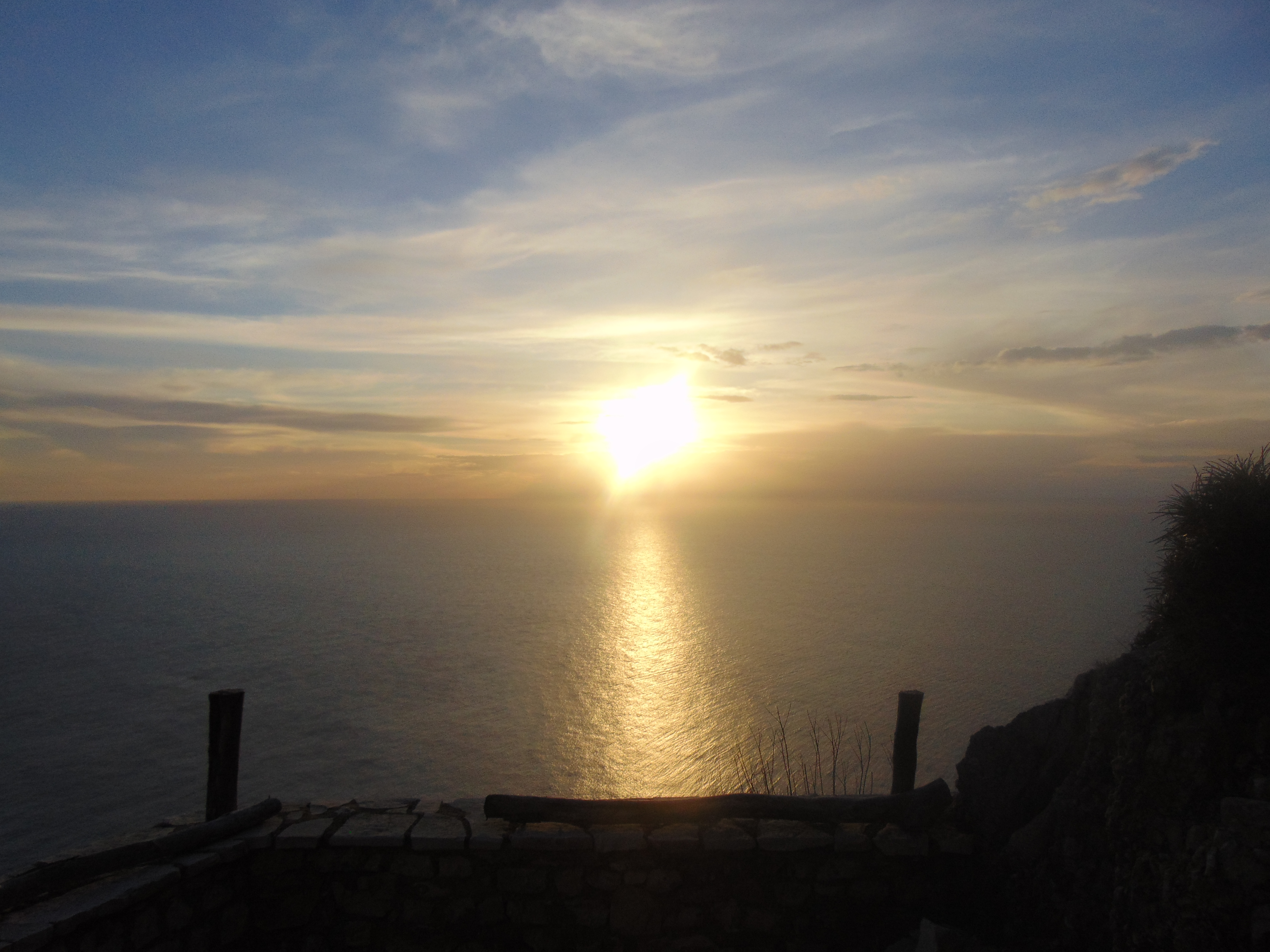
Sunset, Chorio

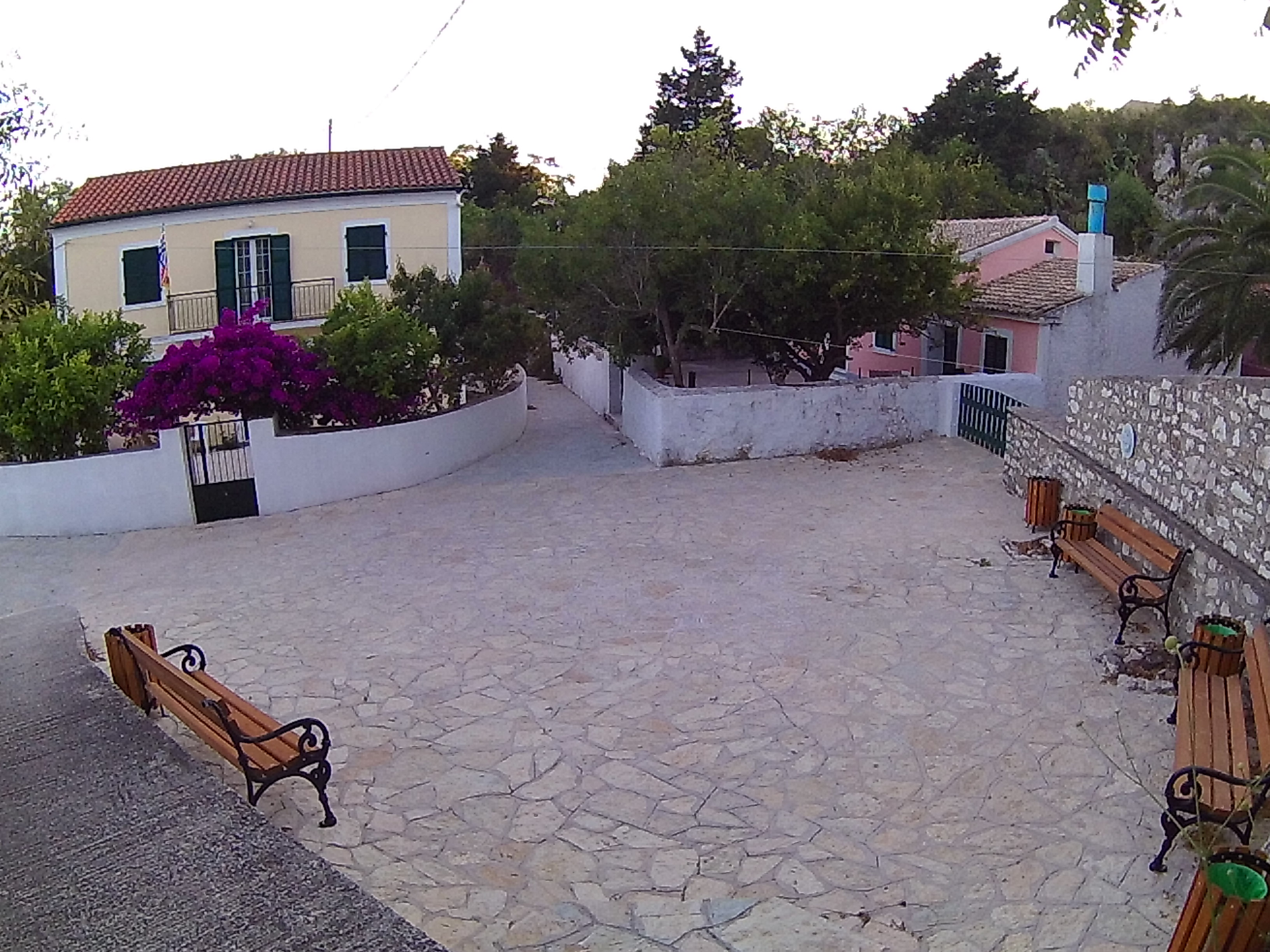
Ztrila square, Chorio

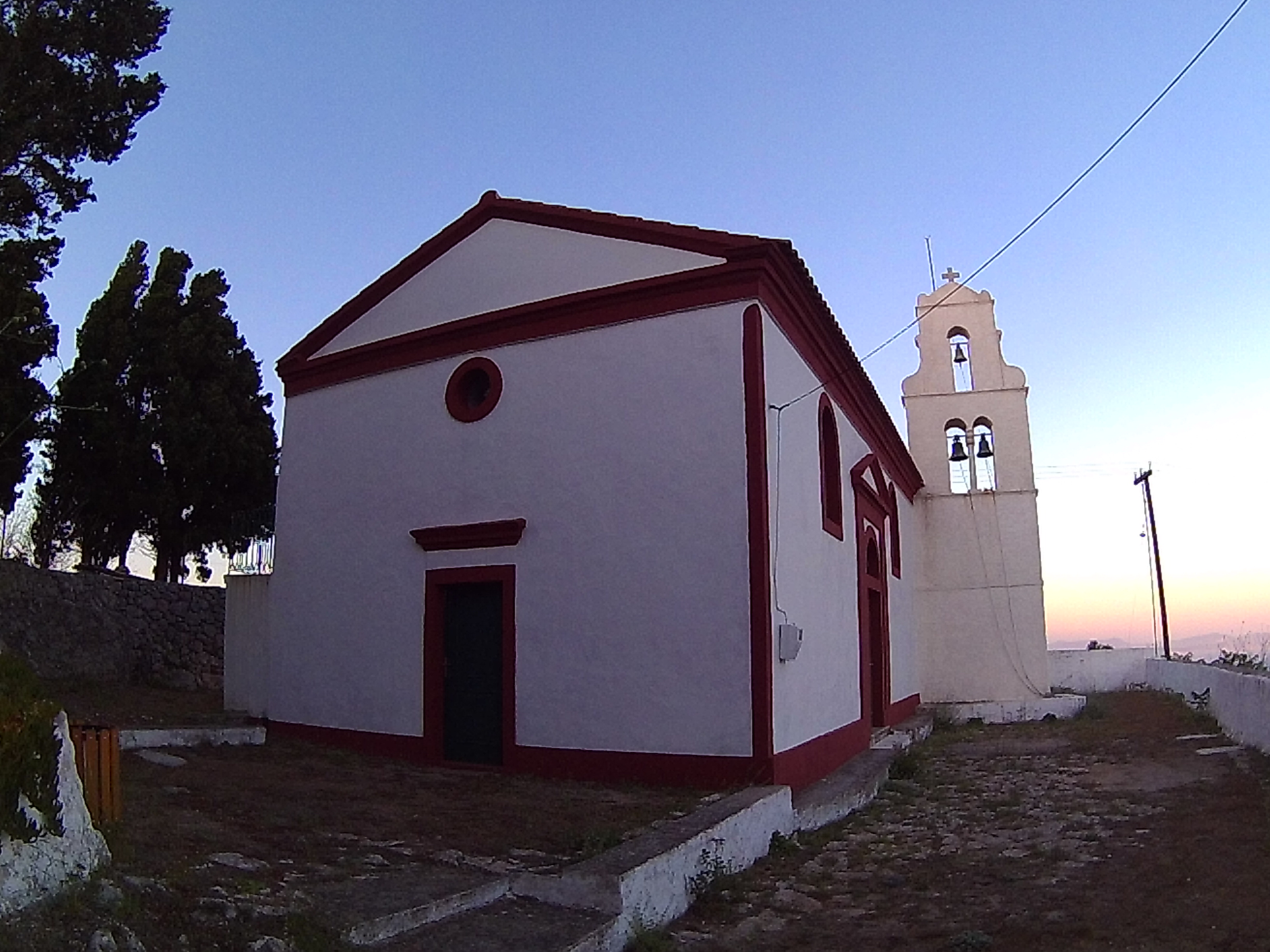
Saint George, Chorio
