= School of Othonoi =

Primary school of Othonoi
- Δημοτικό σχολείο Οθωνών
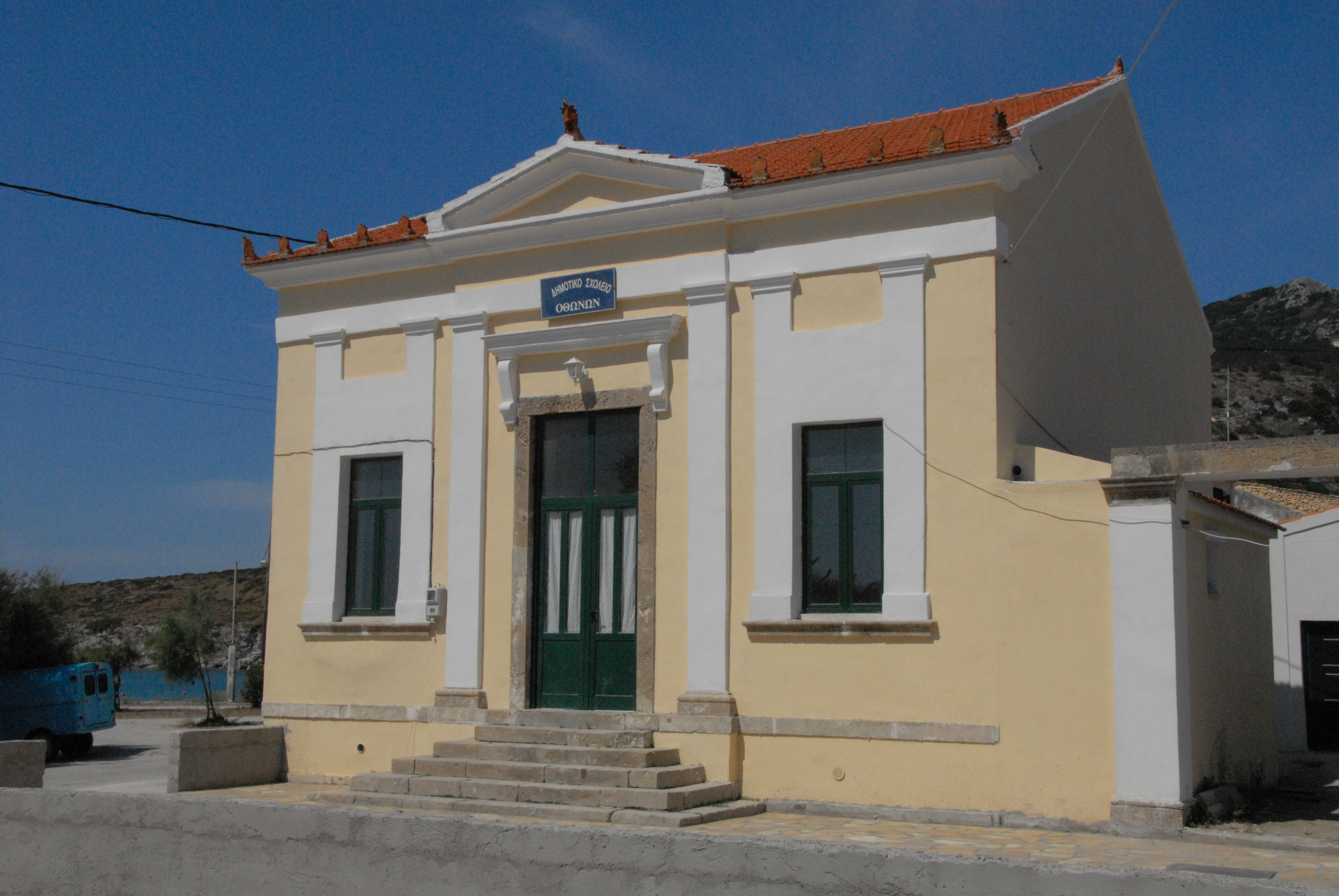
- School of Othonoi

General information
- Type: Primary School
- Architectural style: neoclassical architecture
- Location: Ammos, Othoni, Greece
- Completed: 1912

Design and construction
- Main contractor: Andreas Syngros

The Primary School of Othonoi (Greek: Δημοτικό Σχολείο Οθωνών) is a public school of Othonoi, in northwestern Greece. It is a stone-built neoclassical building, a donation of the Greek benefactor Andreas Syngros.
