= Daphni, Othonoi =

Dafni Δάφνη
- Settlement
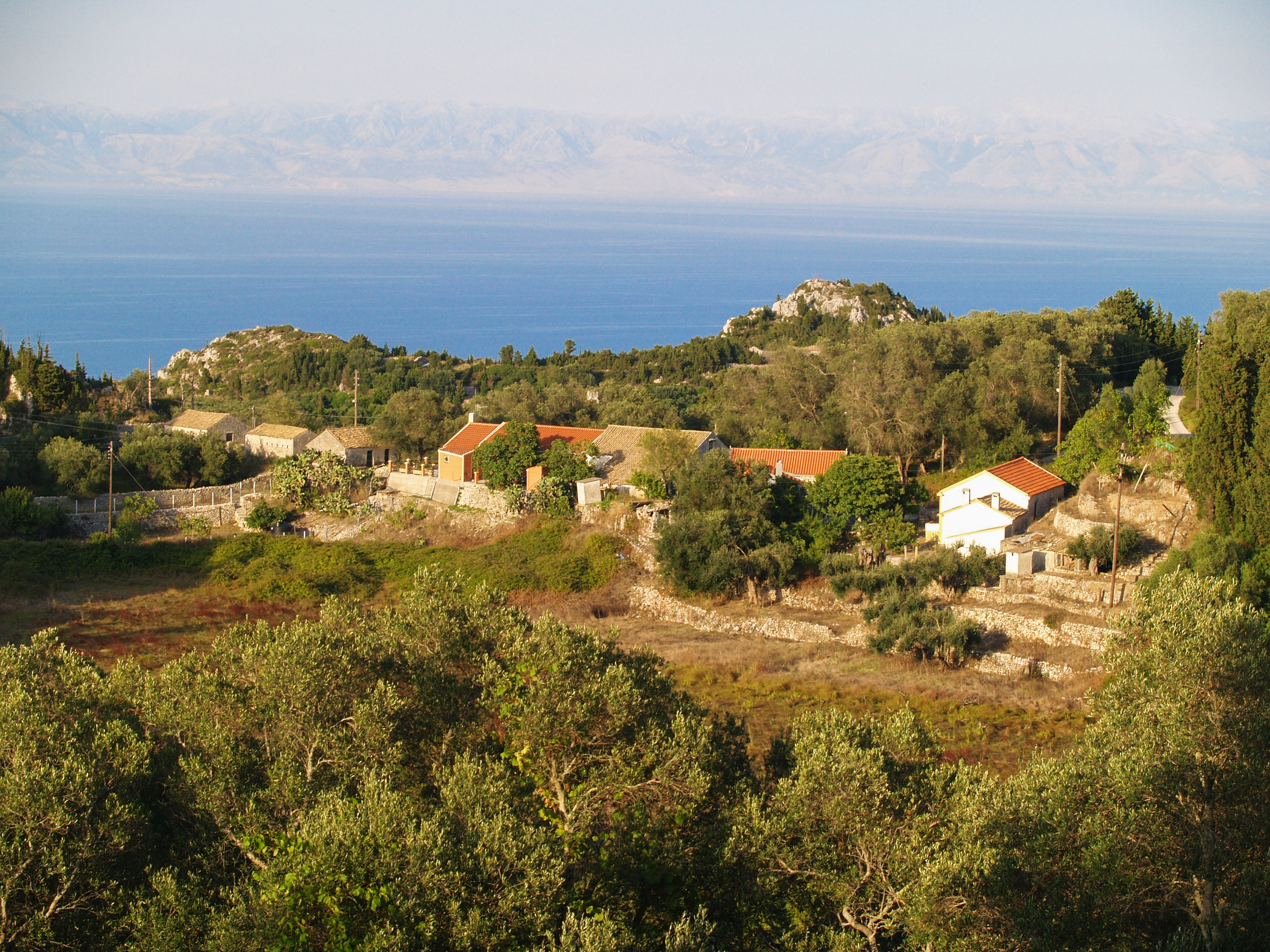

- Location within Greece
- Coordinates: 39°55′N 19°23′E
- Country: Greece
- Administrative region: Ionian Islands
- Regional unit: Corfu
- Municipality: Central Corfu and Diapontian Islands
- Municipal unit: Othonoi

Population (2021)
  - Total: 26
- Time zone: UTC+2 (EET)
  - Summer (DST): UTC+3 (EEST)
- Postal code: 49100
- Area code: +30 26630
- Vehicle registration: KY
- Website: diapontia.gr

Dafni or Daphni (Greek: Δάφνη) is a village in Ano Panta region, on the island of Othonoi, Greece. It is considered one of the original settlements on the island. Prior to the massive immigration of the later part of the twentieth century, Dafni was considered the most populous village on the island with up to 250 inhabitants in the early 1960s. Although currently the settlement is largely abandoned from permanent residents, Dafni has the largest concentration of houses on the island of Othoni. Most of these were built in the late 1800s to early 20th century and have a distinct local architecture. In recent years there has been some restoration of these homes by locals and others. The houses are distinctly built and scattered within centuries old olive groves with a view to the Adriatic and Ionian Seas. The Church of Virgin Mary and its accompanied cemetery is a distinct monument in the area. It was built on top of a hill in the 1600s and is impressively well preserved today. There is also a trail from Dafni to the coast of Fyki.

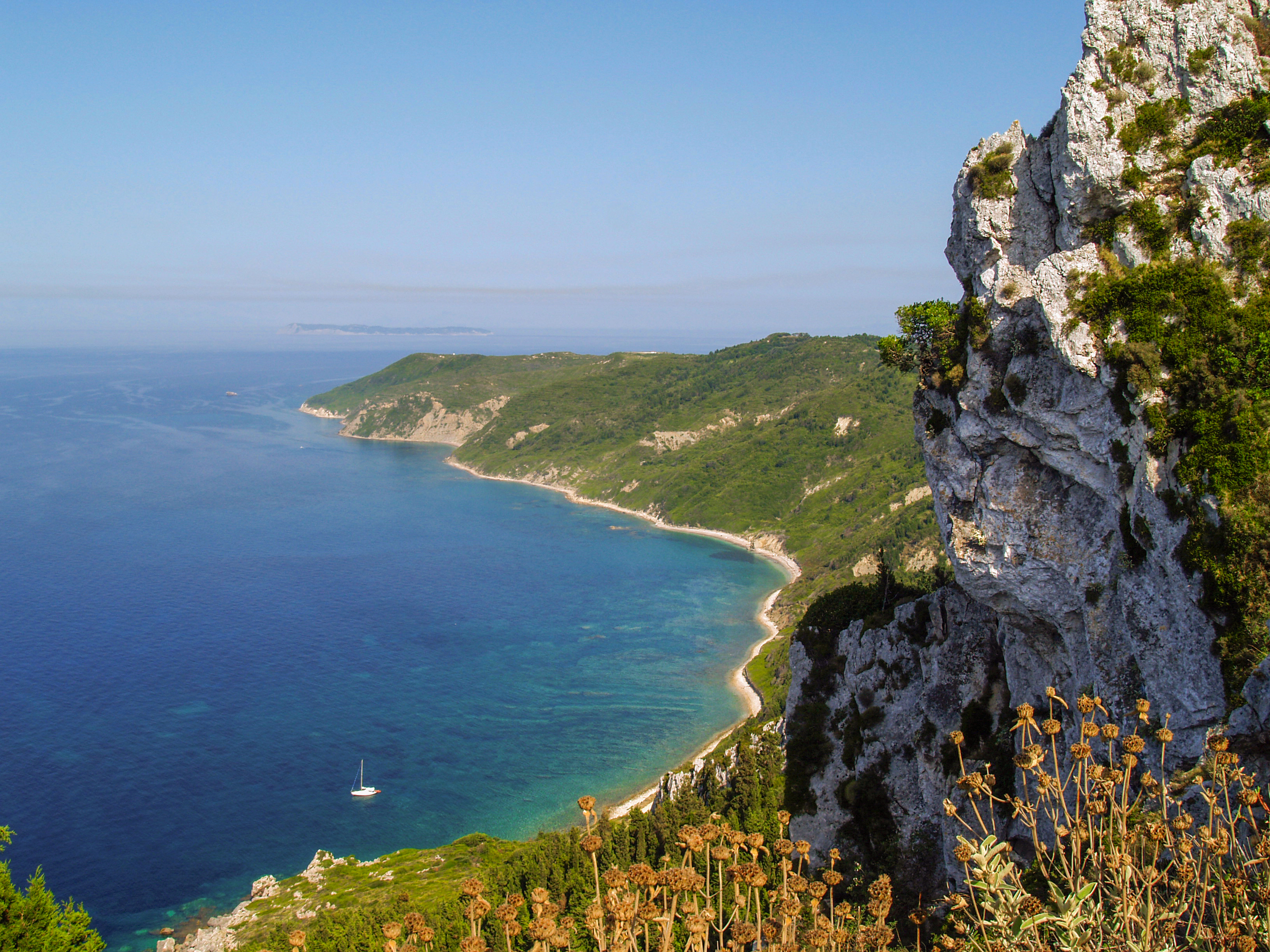
Fyki bay
