= Stavros, Othonoi =

Stavros Σταυρός
- Settlement
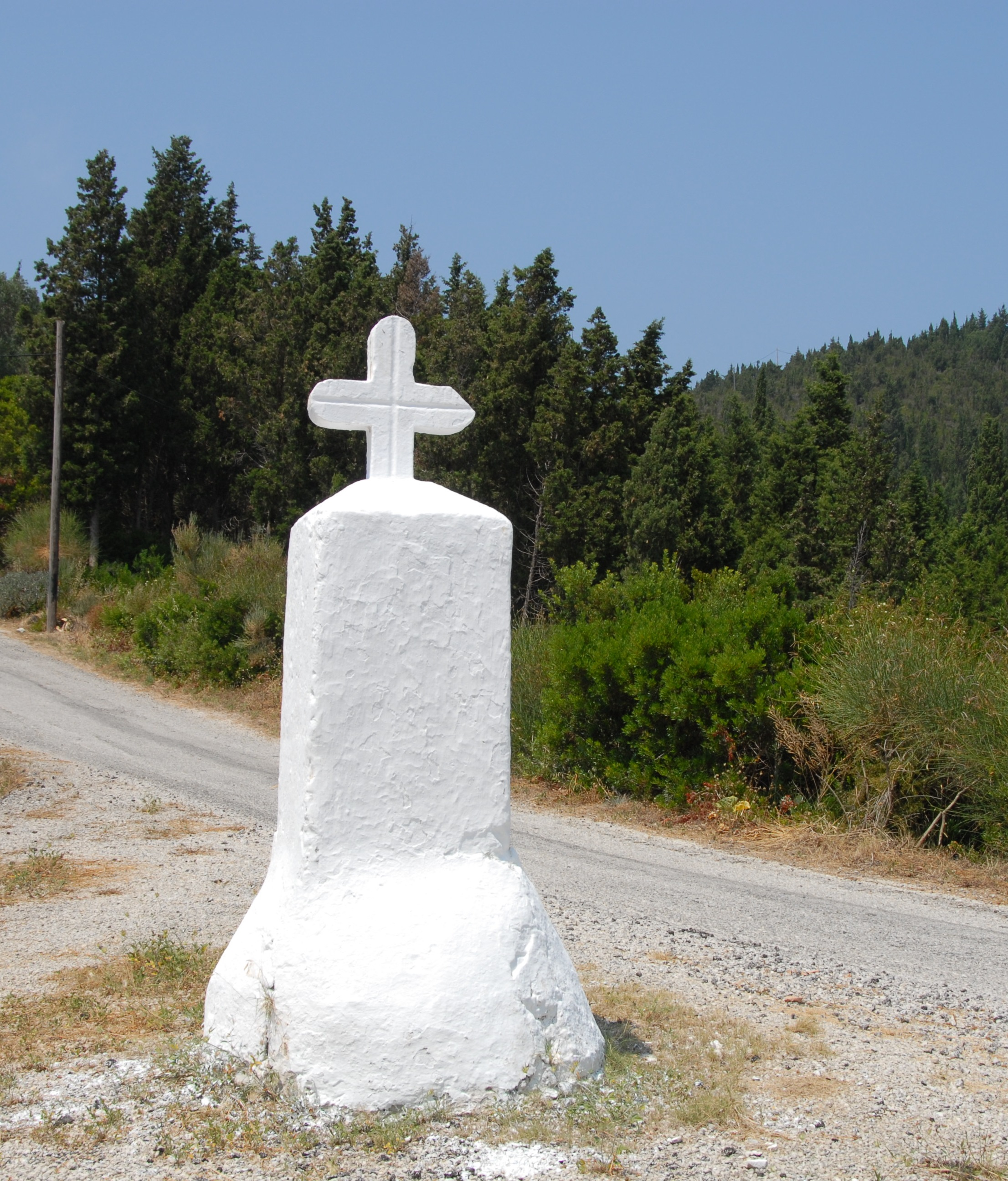
- The cross at Stavros

- Location within Greece
- Country: Greece
- Geographic region: Ionian Islands
- Administrative region: Corfu
- Regional unit: Diapontia Islands
- Highest elevation: 217 m (712 ft)
- Time zone: UTC+2 (EET)
  - Summer (DST): UTC+3 (EEST)
- Postal codes: 49100
- Telephone: +30 26630
- Vehicle registration: KY
- Patroness saint: Virgin Mary (15 August)

Stavros (Greek: Σταυρός) is a village on the island of Othonoi, Greece. It takes its name from the Cross monument, located at an altitude of 217 meters, that commemorates the massacre of the inhabitants of the island by the Ottoman fleet under Hayreddin Barbarossa in 1537 when Diapontia islands and Corfu were parts of Republic of Venice.

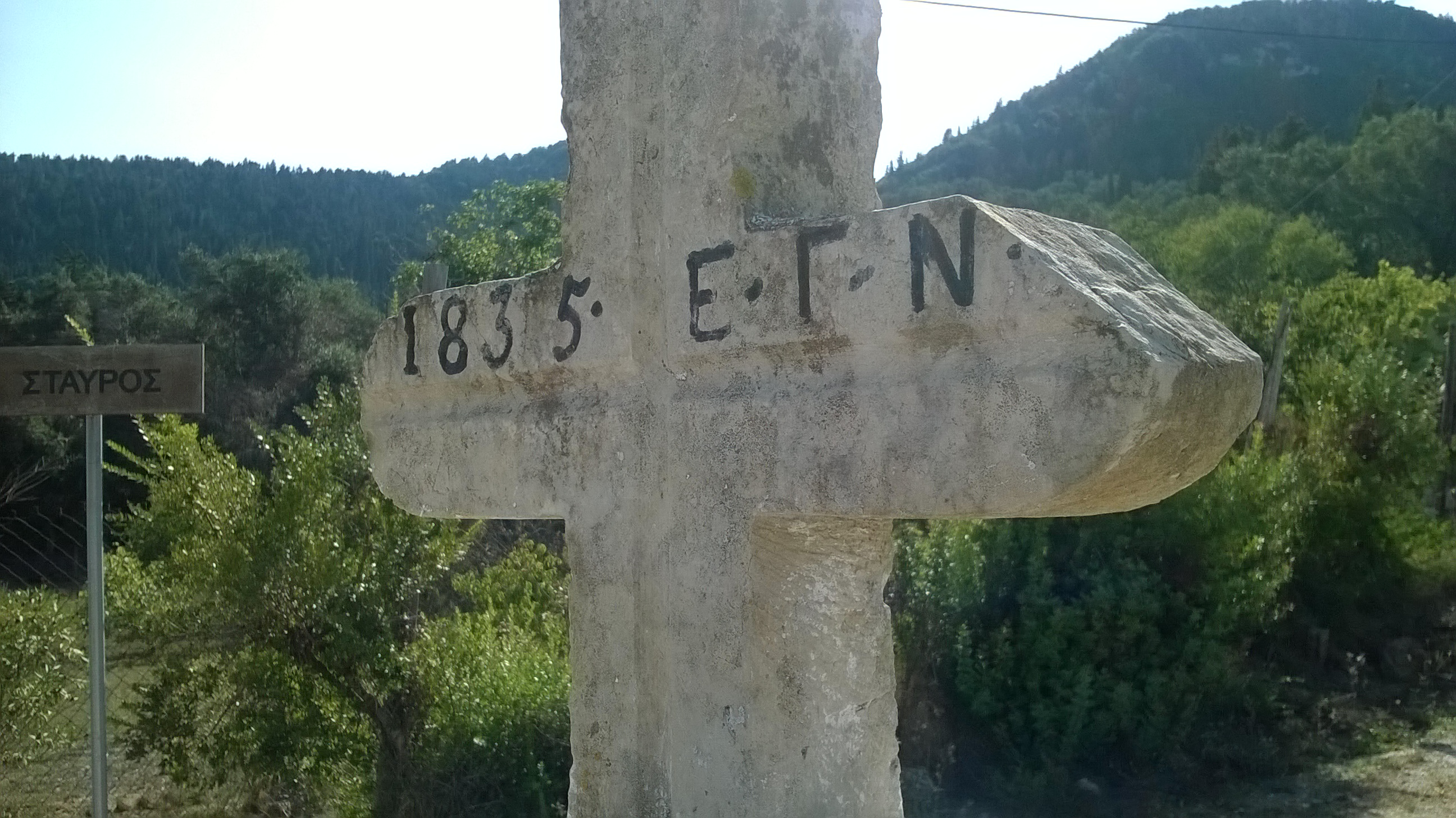
Stavros monument
