= Othonoi =

Greek island in the Ionian Sea

Native name: Οθωνοί Nickname: Calypso Island (Το νησί της Καλυψούς) Ogygia (Ωγυγία)
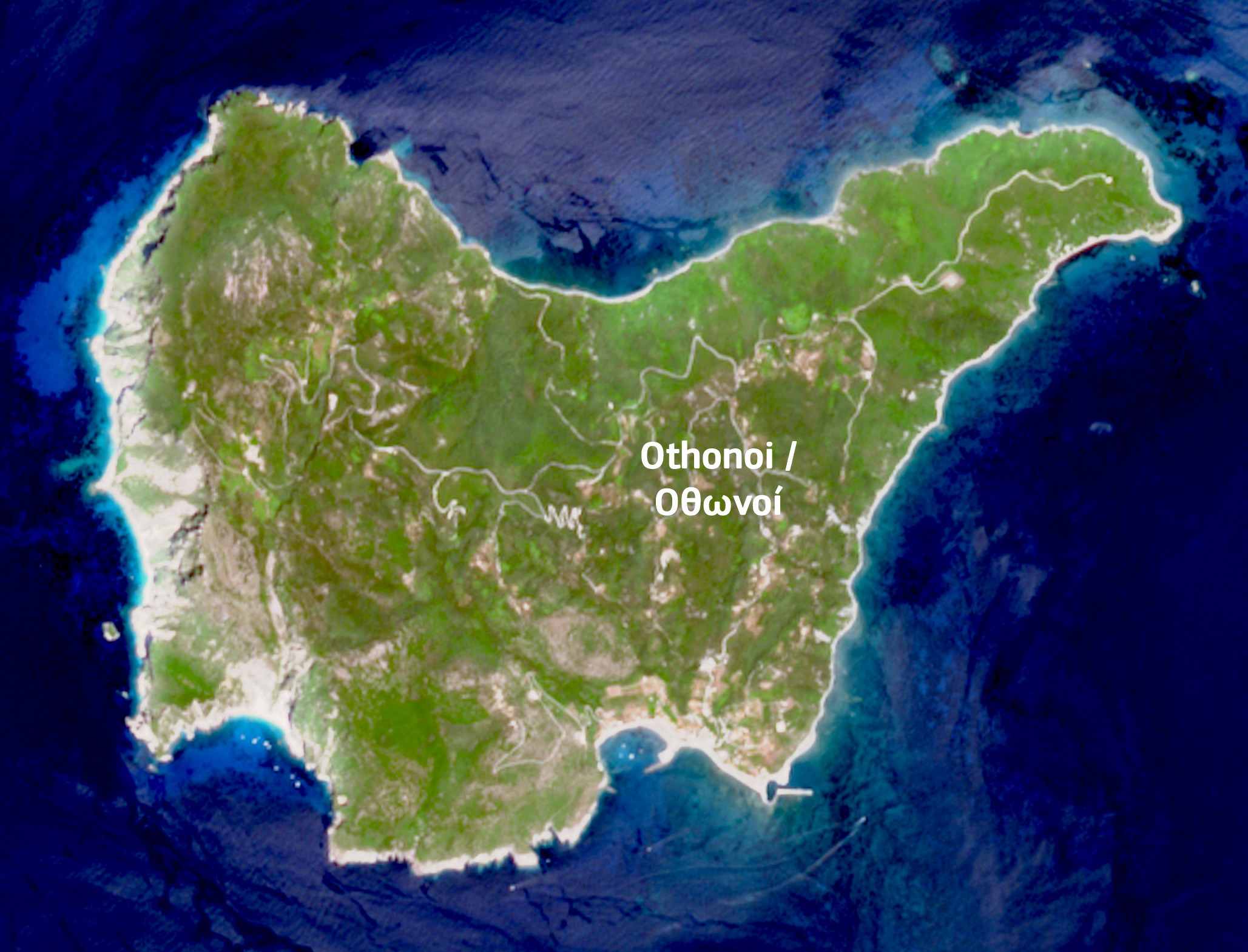
- Satellite view of Othonoi

- Location within the regional unit of Corfu

Geography
- Location: Diapontian Islands
- Coordinates: 39°51′N 19°24′E
- Archipelago: Ionian Islands
- Area: 10.078 km^{2} (3.891 sq mi)
- Highest elevation: 393 m (1289 ft)
- Highest point: Imerovigli

Administration
- Greece
- Region: Ionian Islands
- Regional unit: Corfu
- Municipality: Central Corfu and Diapontian Islands
- Capital city: Ammos

Demographics
- Demonym: Othonian (Greek: Othoniotis)
- Population: 386 (2021)

Additional information
- Postal code: 49150
- Area code: 26630
- Vehicle registration: KY
- Official website: www.diapontia.gr

Othonoi (Greek: Οθωνοί, also rendered as Othoni, Ancient Greek: Ὀθρωνός, romanized: Othrōnós) is a small inhabited Greek island in the Ionian Sea, located northwest of Corfu, and is the westernmost point of Greece. Othonoi is the largest and most populated of the Diapontian Islands. Since the 2019 local government reform it is part of the municipality of Central Corfu and Diapontian Islands.

In the 19th century the island was the capital of the Diapontia Islands municipality, which also included nearby islands of Ereikoussa, Mathraki, islets and rocks of Diakopo, Diaplo, Karavi, Kastrino, Leipso, Ostrako, Plaka, Plateia and Tracheia. Othonoi is about 47 nautical miles from Santa Maria di Leuca cape, Italy.

== Name ==
The first name according to ancient texts (Hesychius, 3rd cent. BC) was "Othronos" (Ὀθρωνός), "Othronoi" (Ὀθρωνοί) and by Procopius seems to be "Othonē" (Ὀθωνή) (6th c.). According to Pliny (1st cent.), it was "Thoronos" (Θόρονος). Other names were "Fidonisi" (Snake island) because of the many snakes that are said to have invaded the island, and "Fanò" (Lamp) which is used in international charters and by the Italians because of the lighthouse situated on the island. Othoni was called Ogygia or "Calypso island" in many maps of the 17th and 18th centuries. Another Greek name for the island is "Astakonisi" (Αστακονήσι); the Albanian name is Strakëna, which may be a cognate of it that ultimately derives from reconstructed Doric Greek Ostrakonásion (Οστρακονάσιον). A second etymological approach for the latter, is that it derives from the plural of the Greek adjective ostrakinón (οστρακινόν), which is ostrakiná (οστρακινά); likely expressing a quality of the island.

Nowadays the Othonians living in Corfu sometimes call the island "Pera" ("Πέρα" meaning: beyond), as the island is located beyond Corfu.

== History ==
At the beginning of the second millennium, the island was conquered alternatively by the Franks (the 11th century) and the Venetians (12th century), and often attacked by pirates of Barbary and Algeria. From the end of 1383 until 1386 the domination of Corfu was held by Charles III of Naples. In a letter from April 19, 1383, he granted the usufruct of Othonoi, Ereikoussa, Mathraki, Diapolo and Vido, to the knight Theodore Skaliti as fief. In 1537, the Turkish fleet under the command of Hayreddin Barbarossa massacred the inhabitants of Othoni island after a long battle. In Stavros district at an altitude of 217 m. a white stone cross exists until today to commemorate that event.

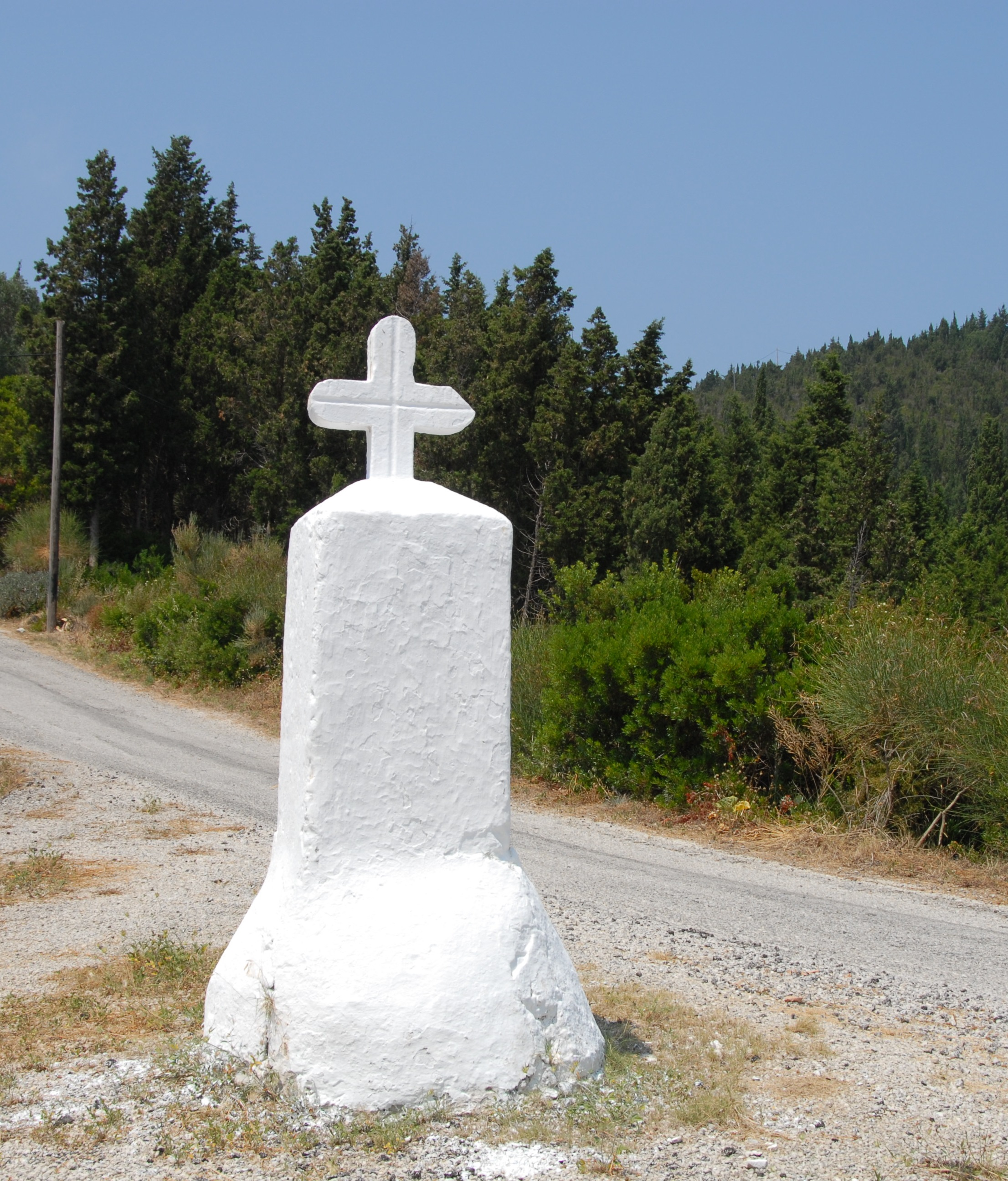
The Cross in Stavros

The last settlers of Othonoi apparently came from Paxos and Ioannina, Parga and the region of Epirus. This occurred after the Battle of Nafpaktos in 1571 when the Turkish fleet was destroyed and the islanders began to move more safely. After the last movement, the residents of Othonoi island colonized the two other small islands, Ereikoussa and Mathraki. In 1815, the British conquered Othonoi. With the Treaty signed on March 29, 1864, between the three powers (United Kingdom, France, Russia) and the Kingdom of Greece, the Ionian Islands including the Diapontian islands passed definitively to Greek sovereignty on 21 May. From 1869 until 1912 Othonoi, Ereikousa and Mathraki formed the municipality of Dimos Diapontion with Othonoi as capital.

=== Sinking of Submarine Protefs ===
On 29 December 1940, the Greek submarine Protefs sank in the sea area of Othonoi. The submarine had attacked an Italian convoy carrying ammunition to Vlorë. After sinking the steamer Sardegna, the submarine was rammed by the Italian torpedo boat Antares. The loss of the submarine was the first loss of the Greek Navy in World War II. A monument to honor the memory of the crew was inaugurated in Othonoi on June 15, 2015.

== Mythology ==
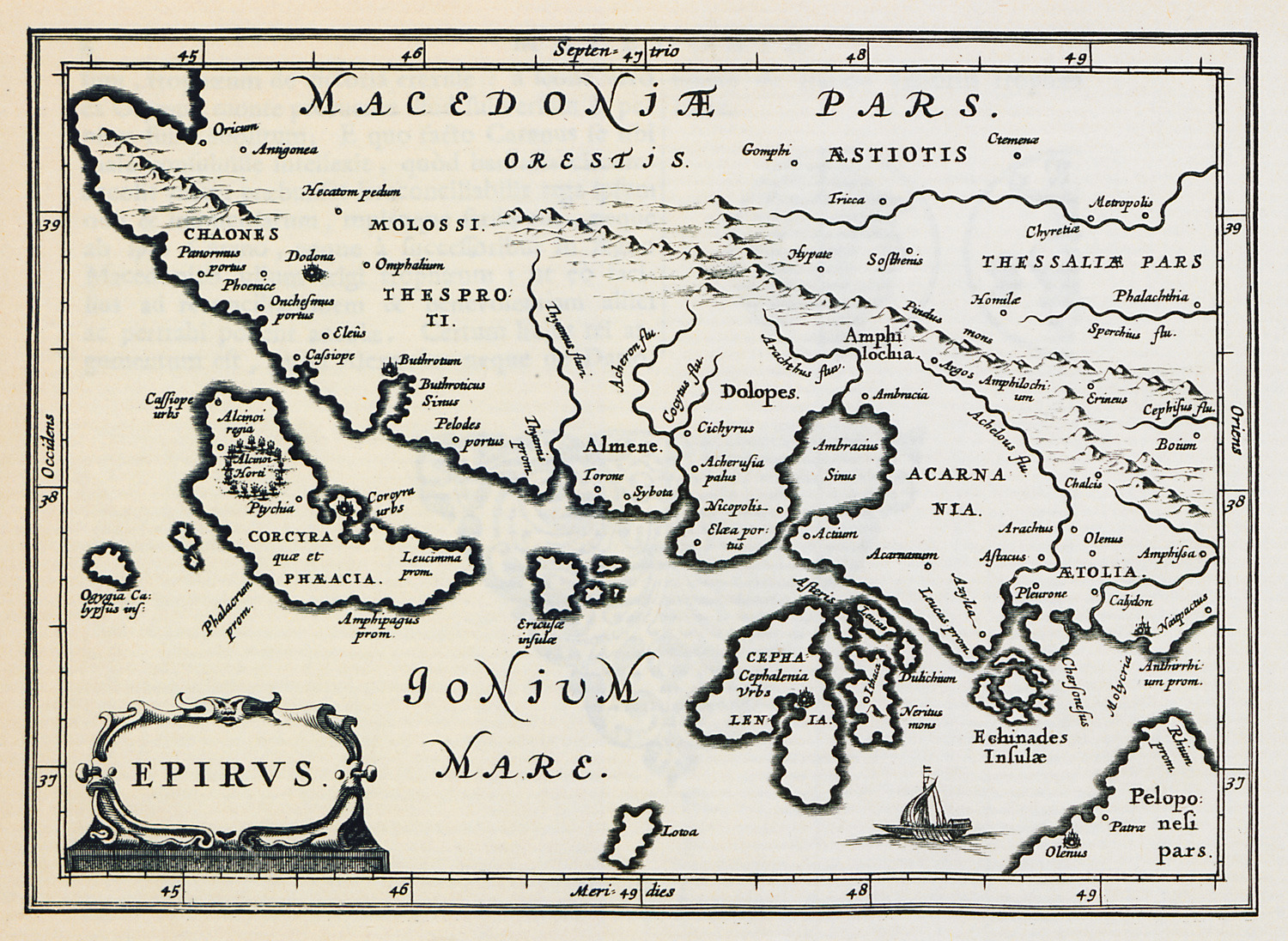
Map by Johann Lauremberg showing Othonoi Island as "Ogygia – Calypsus Island", 1661

According to legend, the ancient poet Homer referred to Othonoi in the Odyssey as Ogygia, island of the nymph Calypso, who lived in a large cave there. Odysseus was enchanted by Calypso, and he remained there for seven years as her prisoner. Odysseus wished to leave the island, as he could no longer bear being separated from his wife, Penelope. During the day, he sat on a headland or at the sea-shore crying, while at night he was forced to sleep with Calypso in a cave against his will.

Maps of geographers like Jean-Baptiste Bourguignon d'Anville, Philipp Clüver, Petrus Bertius, and Aaron Arrowsmith, refer to Ogygia as an island northwest of Corfu, Greece.

Some evidence in favor of this legend appears in the same writings of Homer. He described a strong scent of cypress on Ogygia, and many cypress trees grow on Othonoi. Shortly after leaving the island on a raft, Odysseus is shipwrecked on the island of Scheria, known today as Corfu. This implies that the two mythical islands were separated by a relatively short distance, and indeed, the islands of Othonoi and Corfu are separated by a relatively short distance.

According to Hesychius, after the Trojan War, Elephenor, king of Avantes, fled from Euboea to the island after the fall of Troy, to atone as he had killed his grandfather, Abas.

== Economy ==
Most Othoniotes (local dialect: Thoniotes) have migrated to Corfu, Athens, and abroad (especially to the USA) because of the unemployment and few exploitable resources (1900–1960). The main work was olive and olive oil production. Most men of that time were involved in nautical professions (sailor, bosun, carpenter, captain, skipper, etc.) and worked on commercial and warships which were operating in every part of the earth. The main occupations of current residents are tourism, construction, fishing, and olive production. Previously, there has been significant cultivation of vines, beekeeping and livestock.

== Settlements ==
Othonoi is divided into two regions which are Ano Panta (Greek: Άνω Πάντα) and Kato Panta (Greek: Κάτω Πάντα). There are more than 20 settlements.

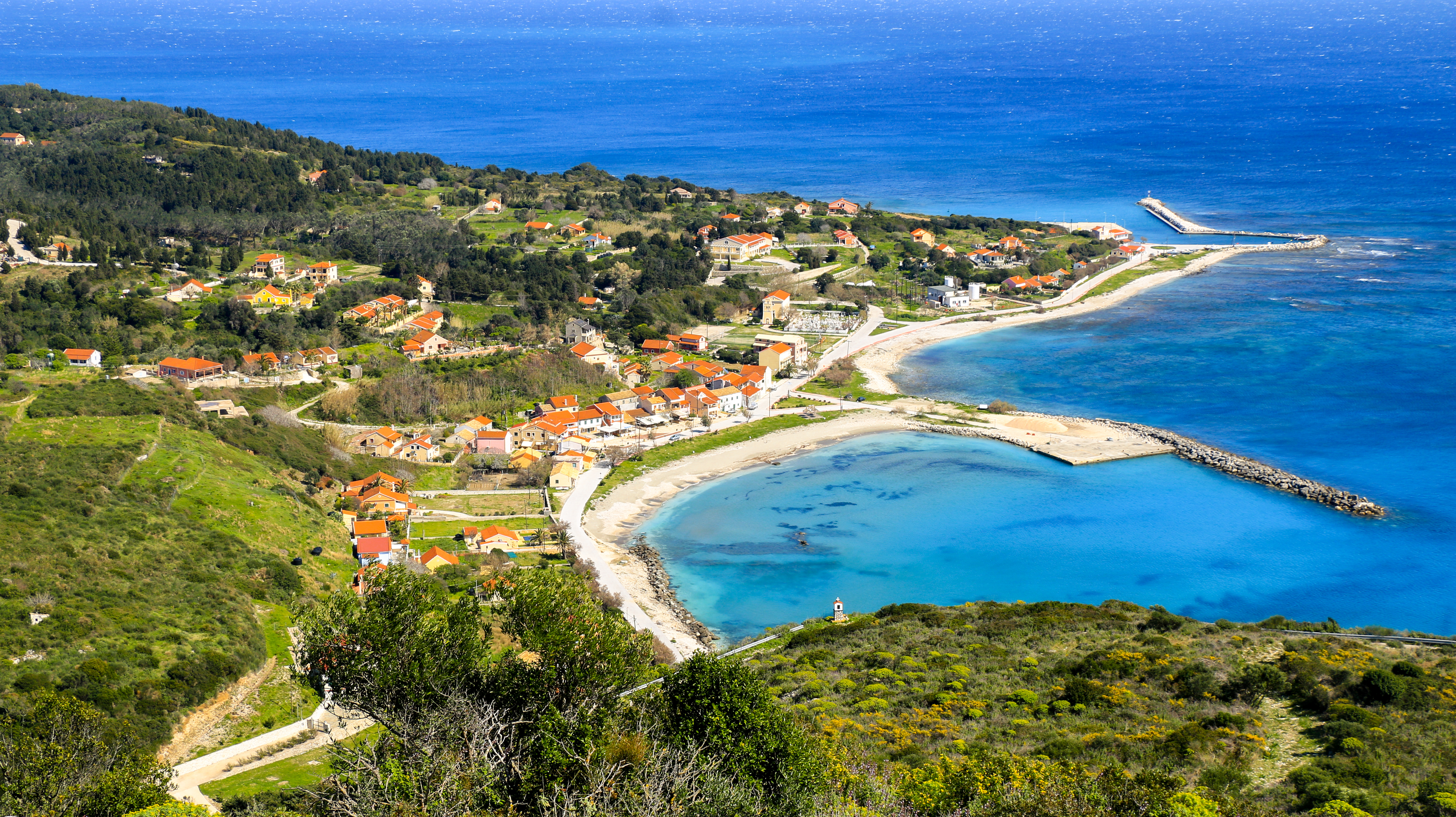
Ammos, Othonoi island

Settlement	Region
Chorio	Ano Panta
Dafni (including Fragoplatika, Nikolatika and Mogiatika)	Ano Panta
Stavros	Ano Panta
Vitsentziatika	Ano Panta
Argyratika	Ano Panta
Deletatika	Kato Panta
Damaskatika	Ano Panta
Katsouratika	Kato Panta
Ammos	Kato Panta
Papadatika	Kato Panta
Mastoratika	Kato Panta
Kasimatika	Kato Panta
Benardatika	Kato Panta
Pagalatika	Kato Panta
Katsouratika	Kato Panta
Mihatika	Kato Panta
Avlakia	Kato Panta

== Main sights ==
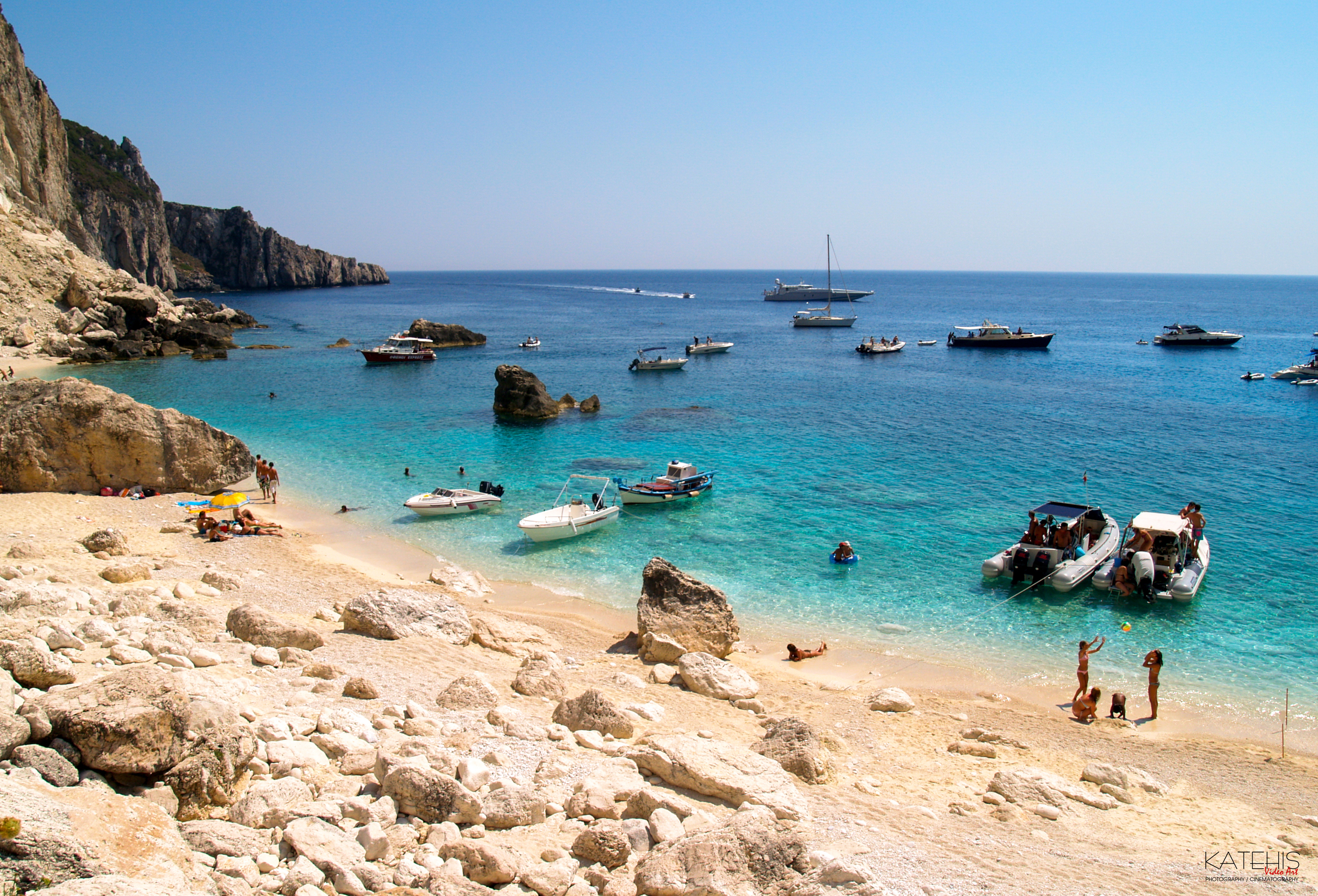
Aspri ammos beach, Othonoi island

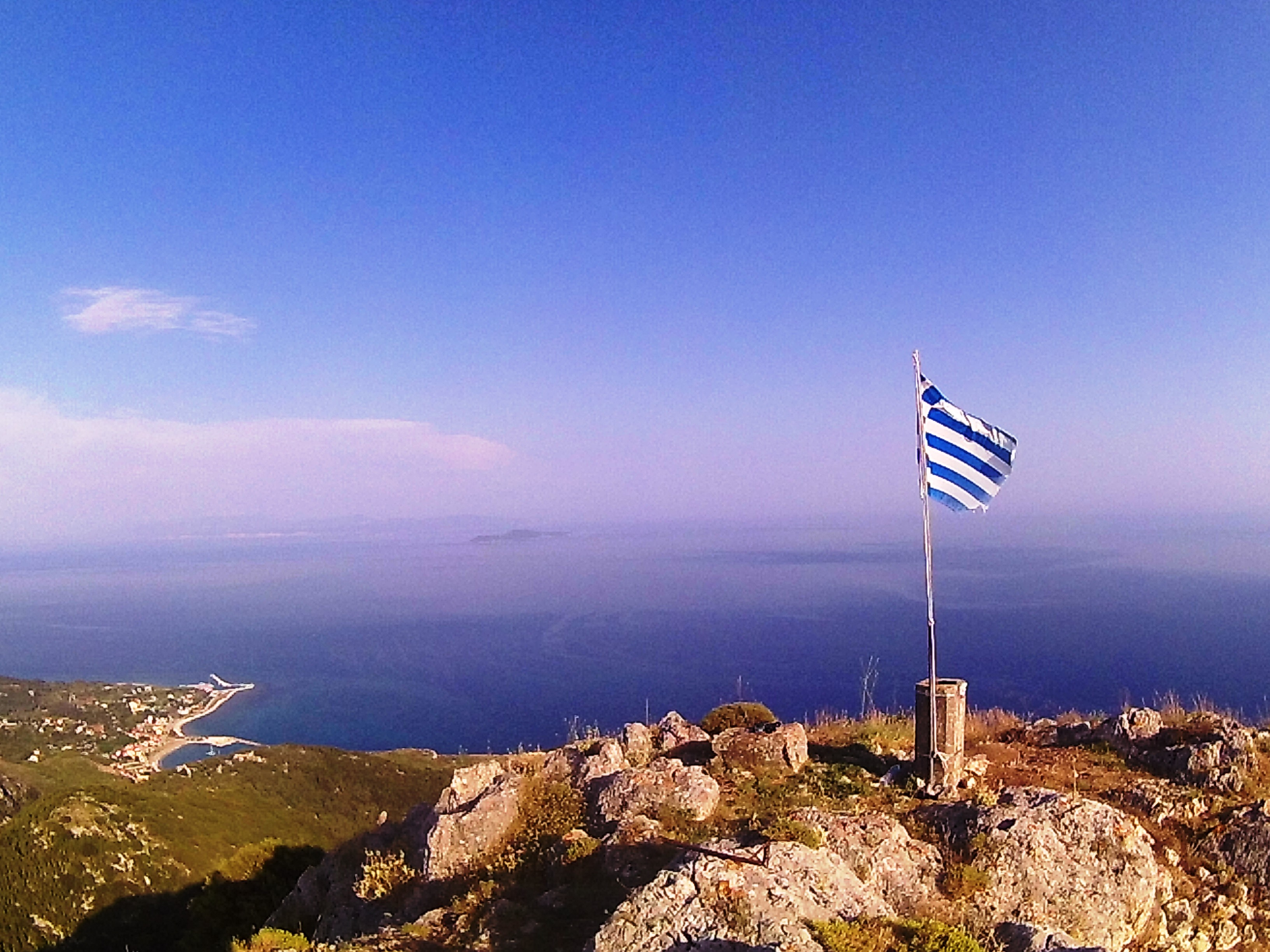
Imerovigli, highest point of Othonoi island

=== Churches ===
- Holy Trinity church (Greek: Εκκλησία Αγίας Τριάδος) (1892) at Ammos.
- Virgin Mary church (Greek: Εκκλησία Παναγίας θεοτόκου) near Stavros district.
- Saint George church(Greek: Εκκλησία Αγίου Γεωργίου) (about 1864) at Chorio.
- Agia Paraskevi church (Greek: Εκκλησία Αγίας Παρασκευής) (and the old stone mill) at Damaskatika.

=== Other buildings ===
- School of Othonoi (Greek: Σχολείο Οθωνών) (1912) at Ammos.
- Ruins of the Venetian fortress at the northeast end of Kastri cape hilltop at an altitude of 100 m.
- Lighthouse of Othonoi (Greek: Φάρος Οθωνών) (built in 1872).

=== Monuments ===
- Cross monument at Stavros, for the massacre of the inhabitants of Othonoi by the Ottoman fleet under Hayreddin Barbarossa in 1537.
- Monument to seafarers of Othonoi island, at Ammos.
- Monument to submarine PROTEUS, at Ammos.

=== Nature ===
- Aspri Ammos beach (Greek: Παραλία Άσπρη άμμος) which is accessible only by boat to the west of the island.
- Cave of Calypso (Greek: Σπήλαιο Καλυψώς), near of Aspri ammos beach.
- Mount Imerovigli (Greek: Όρος Ημεροβίγκλι) and the highest peak of the island with height of 395 metres (1,296 ft)
- Kamara (Greek: Καμάρα) near Ammos.
- Iliovasilema (sunset) at Chorio.

=== Beaches ===
Most beaches on the island are accessible by boat, including Ammos, Molos, Kamini, Kanoula, Kontoskes, Rogi, Fyki, Xilosermi, and Aspri Ammos. It is a well-known island for underwater photography because of the peculiar geomorphology of the seabed and the many caves. Other points of interest are the Moshopontikas, Xylosermi, Fyki bay (where there is the sunken wreck of Sarah ship). Othonoi was frequently visited by the French naturalist Jacques Cousteau and his exploratory vessel Calypso.

=== Trails ===
The traditional trail was created and used by the first inhabitants and was subsequently reopened by the municipality and private initiatives. Locals and visitors can use the trail to reach almost every neighborhood and part of the island on foot, as well as Mount Imerovigli (Merovigli), and the highest peak of the island, with a height of over 390 metres (1,280 ft), with views of the other Diapontia Islands, Ionian Sea and Adriatic Sea.

=== Others ===
- Port of Ammos (Greek: Λιμένας Άμμου) is the most populous district with small guesthouses, restaurants, rent-a-bike store, cafes, police station, a community clinic with ambulance and port authority.

== Nature ==
=== Flora ===
The island is almost completely covered by trees which produce a small species of olive, the "Elea the cherry" (Olea microcarpa), commonly Lianolia or ladoelia, with a high content of high-quality oil, which is common in all the Ionian Islands. It was densely planted during Venetian rule, so most are aged 300–400 years exceeding a height of 7 metres (23 ft). There are cypresses and fruit trees on almost all mountain slopes. The tall mulberry (or Skamnia) and fig (or Skeria) are found in nearly all districts and gardens that host many species of fruit and vegetables, and features large cabbage called by Othoniotes cramps, as in Cyprus. Most houses have, instead of tents or sheds, pergolas with vines or pergoulies. Oregano, sage and many other herbs.

=== Fauna ===
Othonoi is the first migratory bird station in southeastern Europe from Libya, especially for turtle doves. There are also grouse and snipe (xilokotes) during the winter months, and peregrine falcons, the European bee-eater birds, martins, ravens and several species of eagles. There are several hares and rabbits. The most common species of reptile is the viper (Vipera ammodytes or astritis). Marine mammals have been observed off the island's coast, including the bottlenose dolphin, at least three species of sharks (including white shark), while sporadically near the cave of Calypso there have been monk seals. Also found are almost all varieties of marine fauna, such as the white sea bream, red mullet, the snapper, the grouper, the bumpkin (weighing up to 30 pounds), octopus, moray, the stingray, lobster. Remarkable is the presence of barnacles and sea urchins. Zooplankton is in small coves of the island and especially in seaweed is abundant at night, and when the sea is calm, the plankton illuminates the sea bed.

== Climate ==
The climate of Othonoi is mild and generally warm and temperate. The winters are rainier than the summers. The Köppen-Geiger climate classification is Csa. The average temperature in Othonoi is 16.7 °C. About 1026 mm of precipitation falls annually.

Climate data for Othonoi island
Month	Jan	Feb	Mar	Apr	May	Jun	Jul	Aug	Sep	Oct	Nov	Dec	Year
Average rainfall mm (inches)	140 (5.5)	114 (4.5)	92 (3.6)	59 (2.3)	40 (1.6)	18 (0.7)	12 (0.5)	22 (0.9)	66 (2.6)	127 (5.0)	173 (6.8)	163 (6.4)	1,026 (40.4)
Source: climate-data.org

== Dialect ==
A dialect is spoken resembling that of Corfu and having similar prosody. It is heavily influenced by Italian.

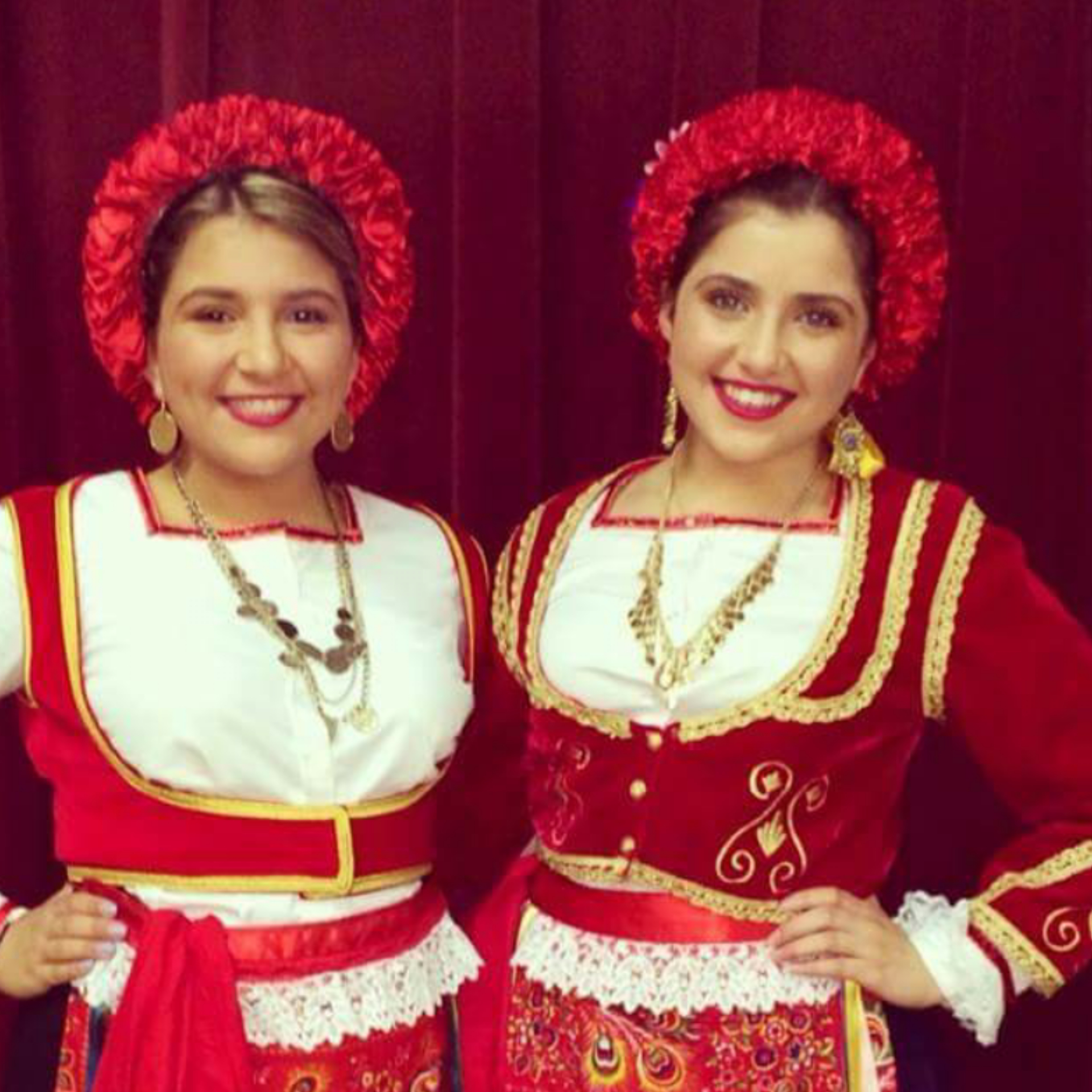
Traditional Diapontian costumes

== Transport ==
The island is accessible by boat with regular services from Corfu port and Agios Stefanos Avliotes. There is a port in Avlakia district (with fishing port), for several small private yachts and boats.The island has a heliport for emergencies. Asphalt roads are available on many parts of the island, about 21 kilometres (13 mi) of which are extended to settlements. There is complete electrification and a telephone network with Internet access.

== In literature ==
- Ionion akron. Greece in the narrow of Otranto (Greek: Ιόνιον άκρων. Η Ελλάδα στο στενό του Ότραντο) (ISBN 960-7062-99-X)
- Folklore mission to Diapontia islands, by Dimitrios Loukatos, 2012 (Greek: Λαογραφική αποστολή στα Διαπόντια νησιά) (ISBN 960-404-246-7)
- Ereikoussa, the extra garden and the continental shelf of Diapontia islands by Greek journalist, Georgios Lekakis, 2014 (Greek: Ερείκουσσα, ο επιπλέον ανθόκηπος και η υφαλοκρηπίδα των Διαποντίων νήσων) (ISBN 978-960-454-102-7)
- The Fiddler's daughter (Greek: Στο καλύβι του Αριά) by Dimitra Kapelouzou, 2004 (ISBN 960-7720-53-9)

== Gallery ==
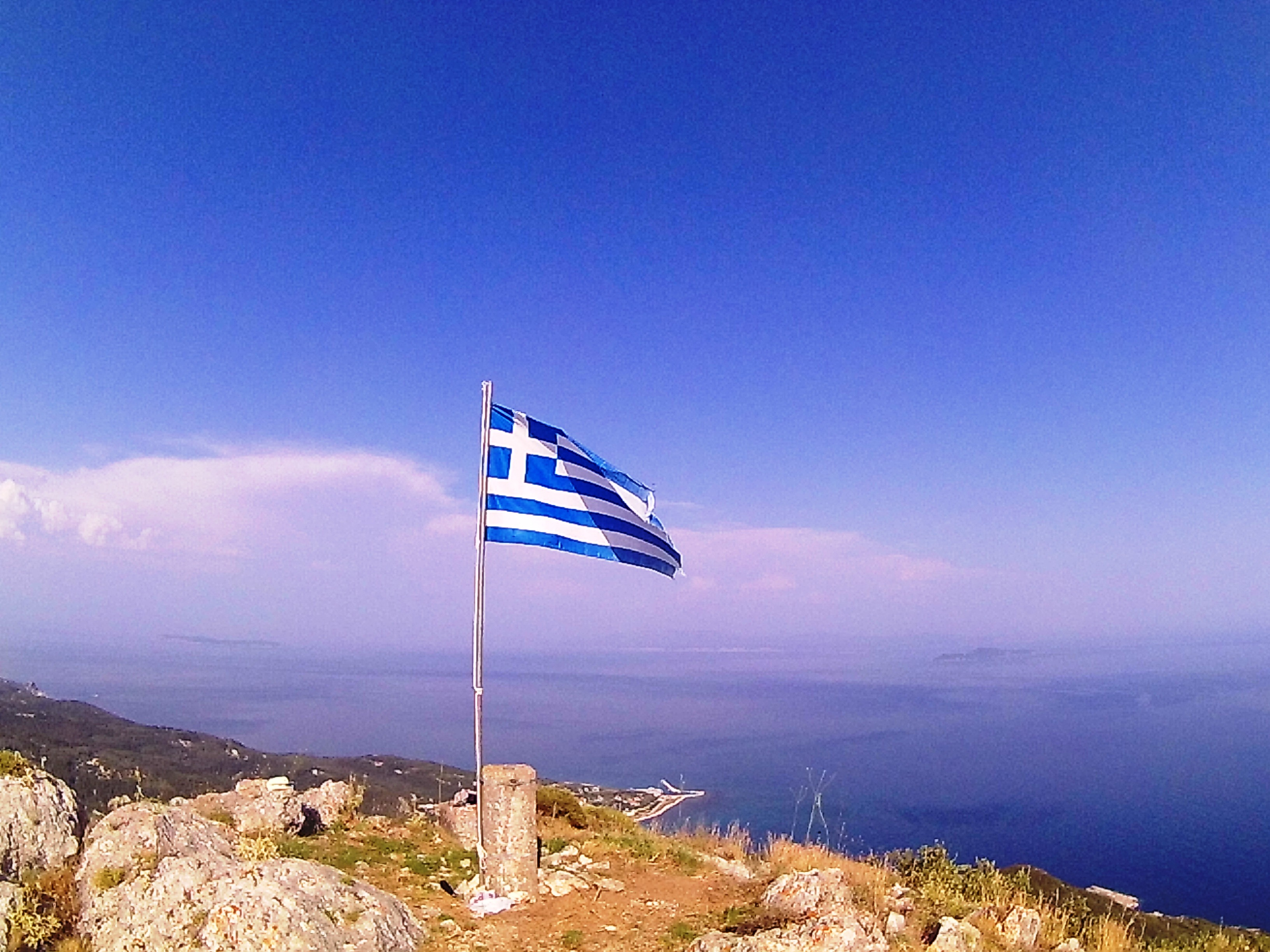
Imerovigli, highest point of Othoni

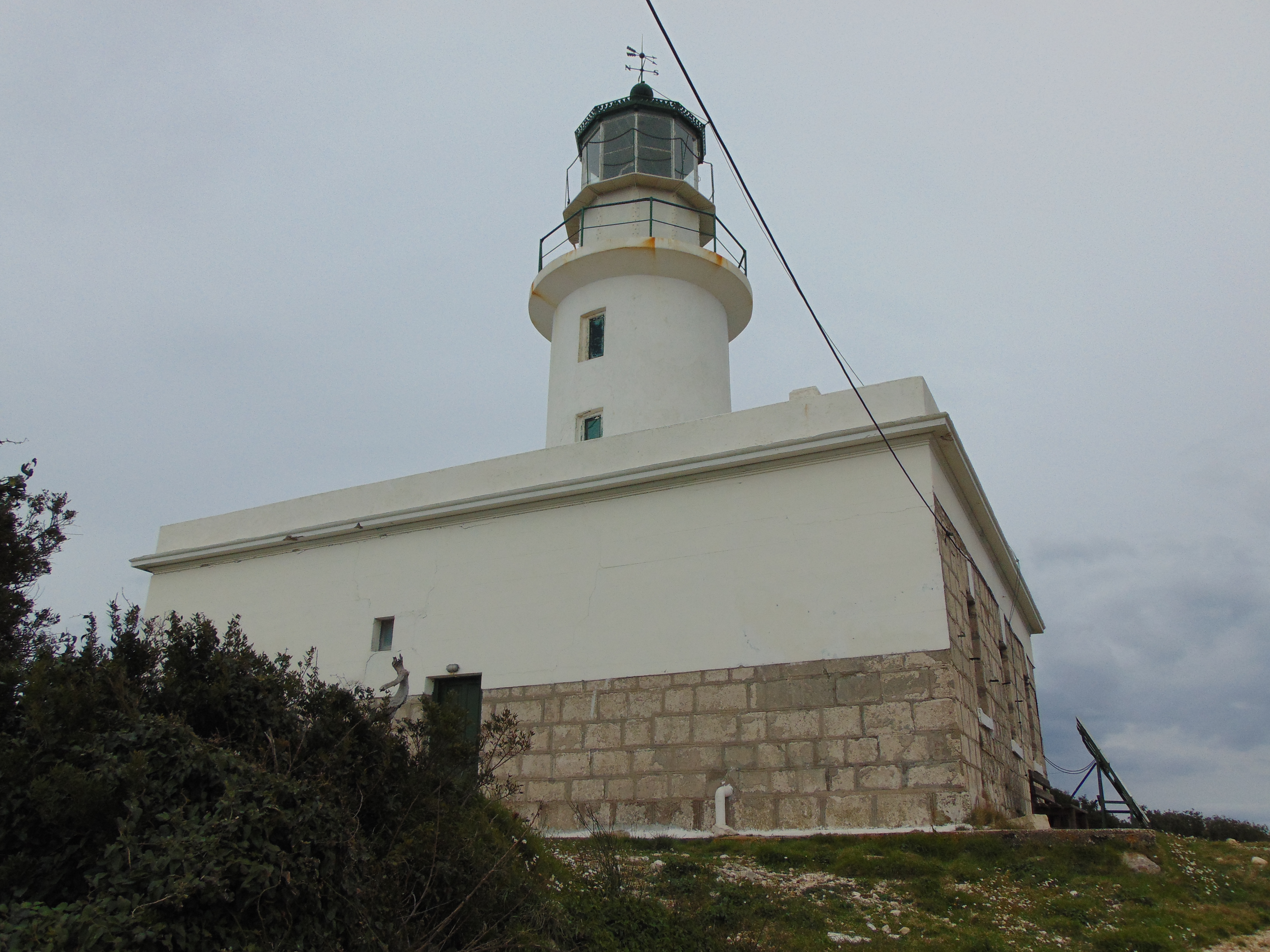
Othonoi's lighthouse

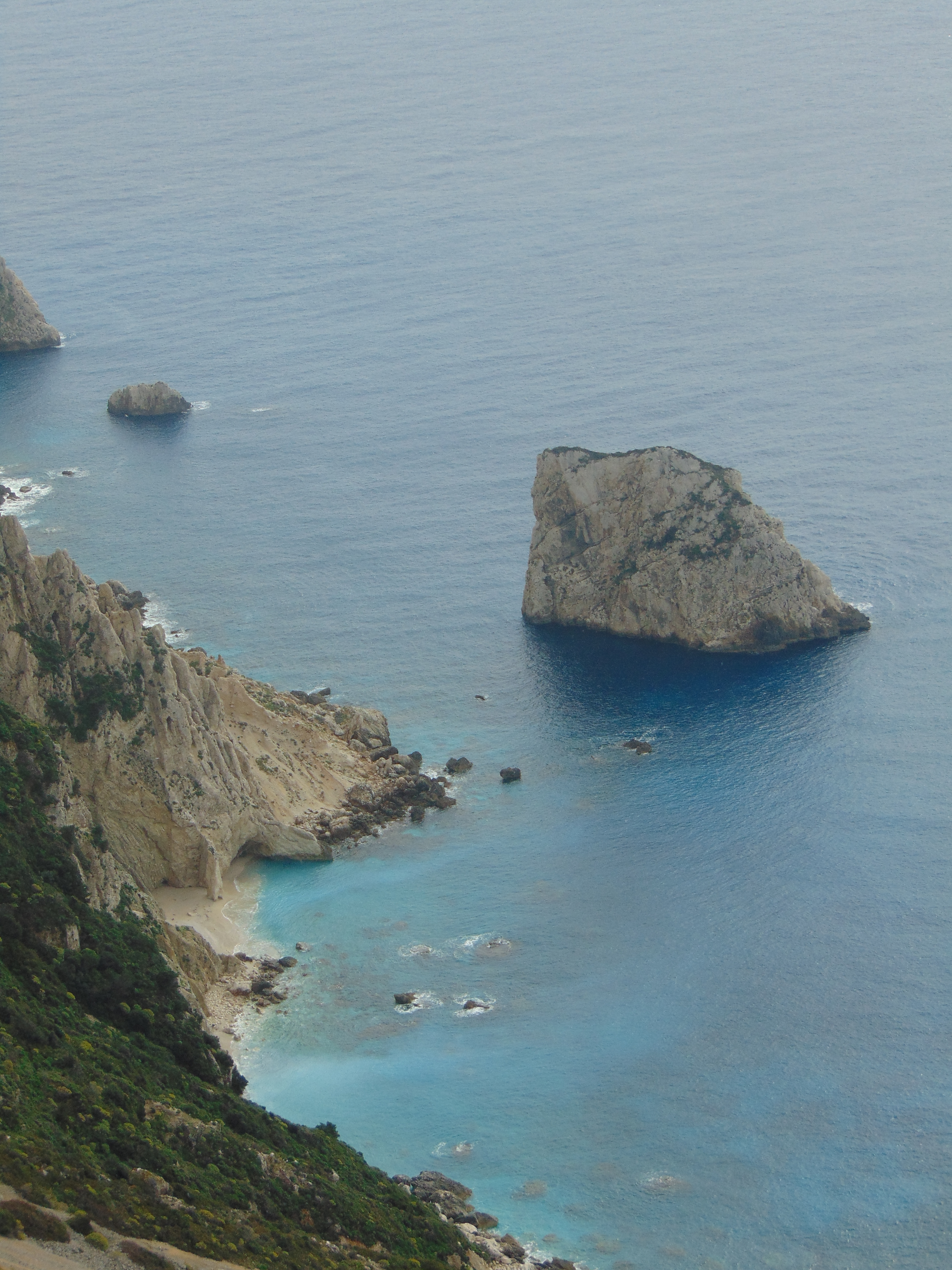
Koukouli rock

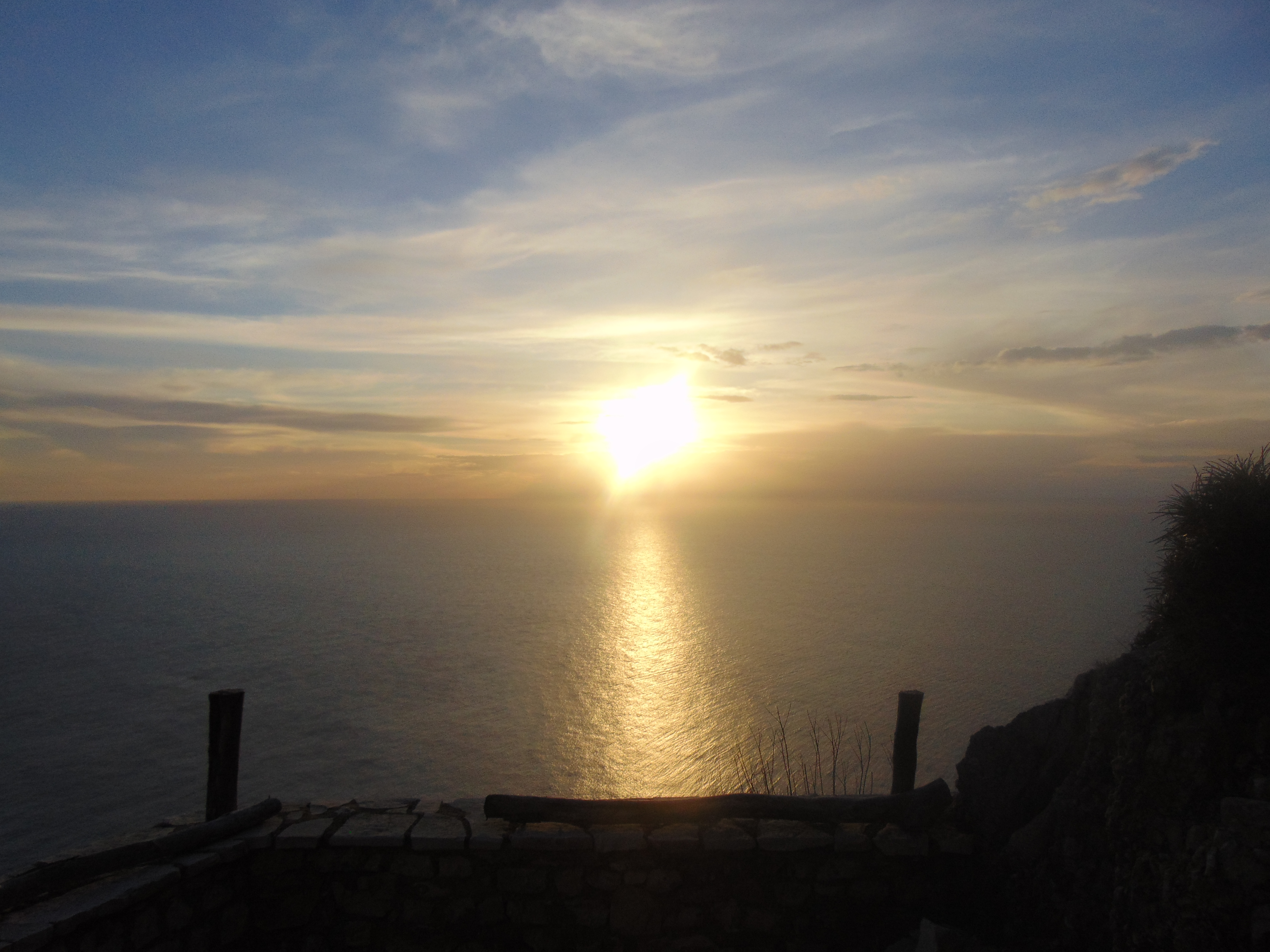
Sunset, Chorio

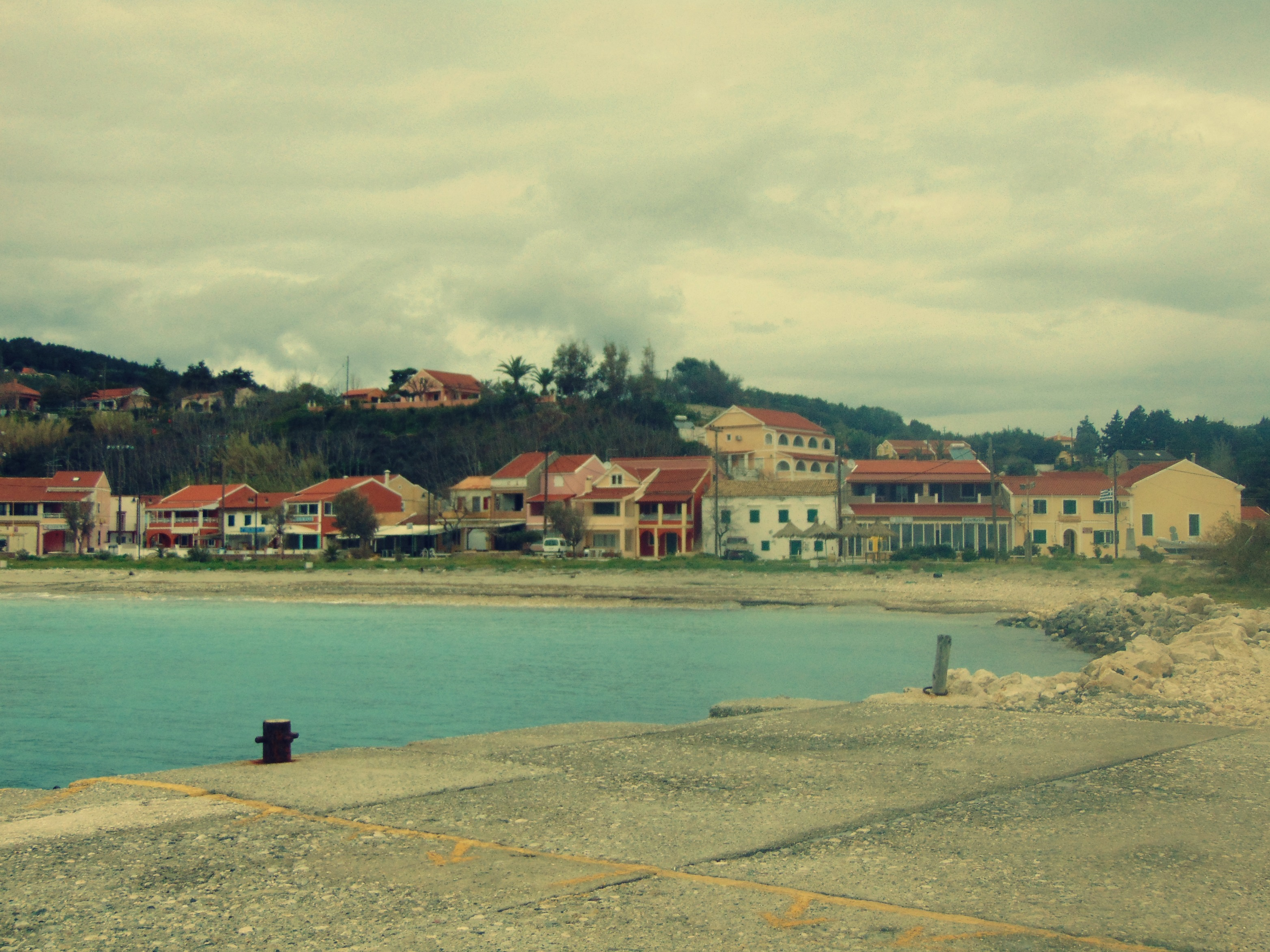
Ammos port

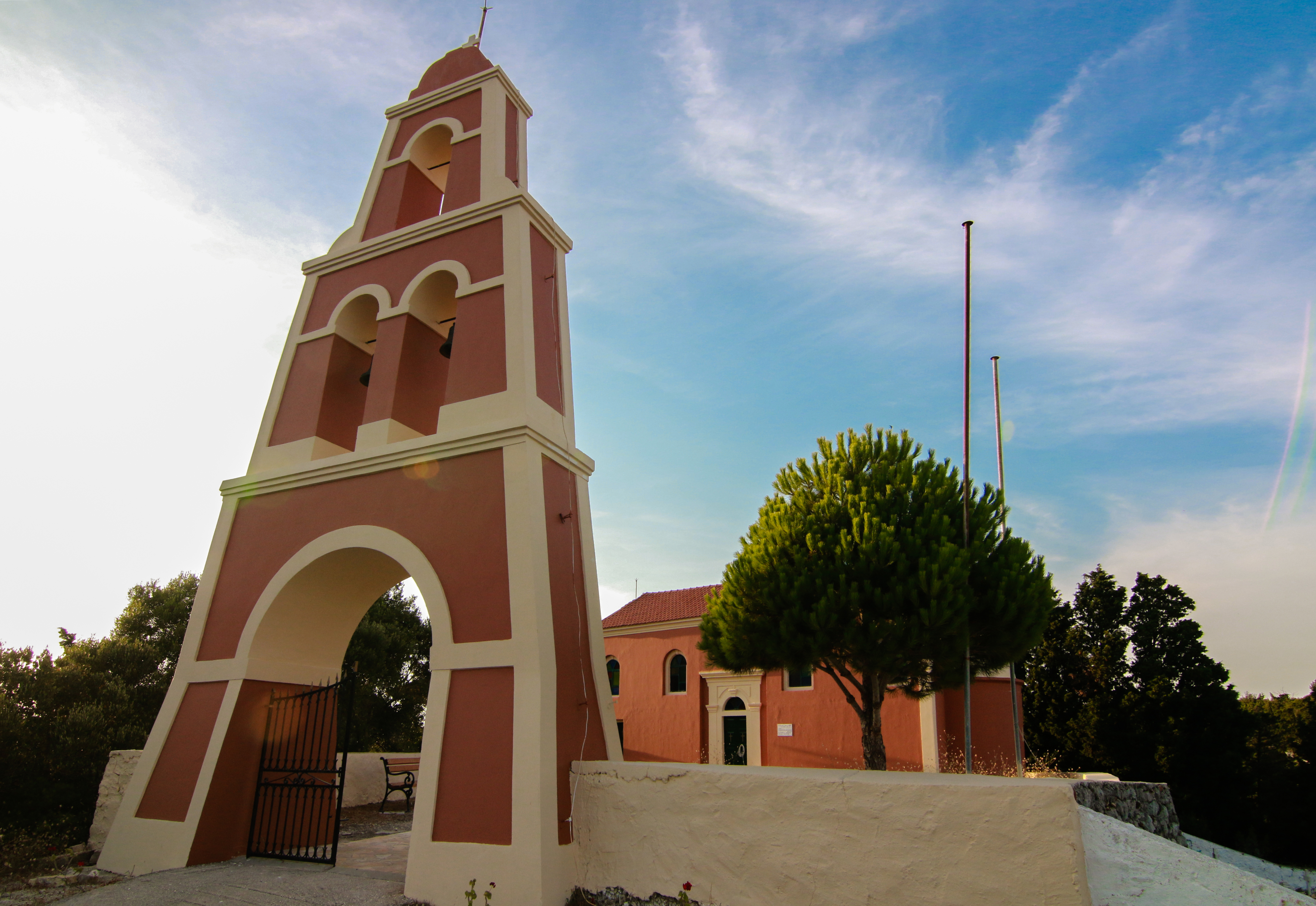
Virgin Mary church, Ano Panta

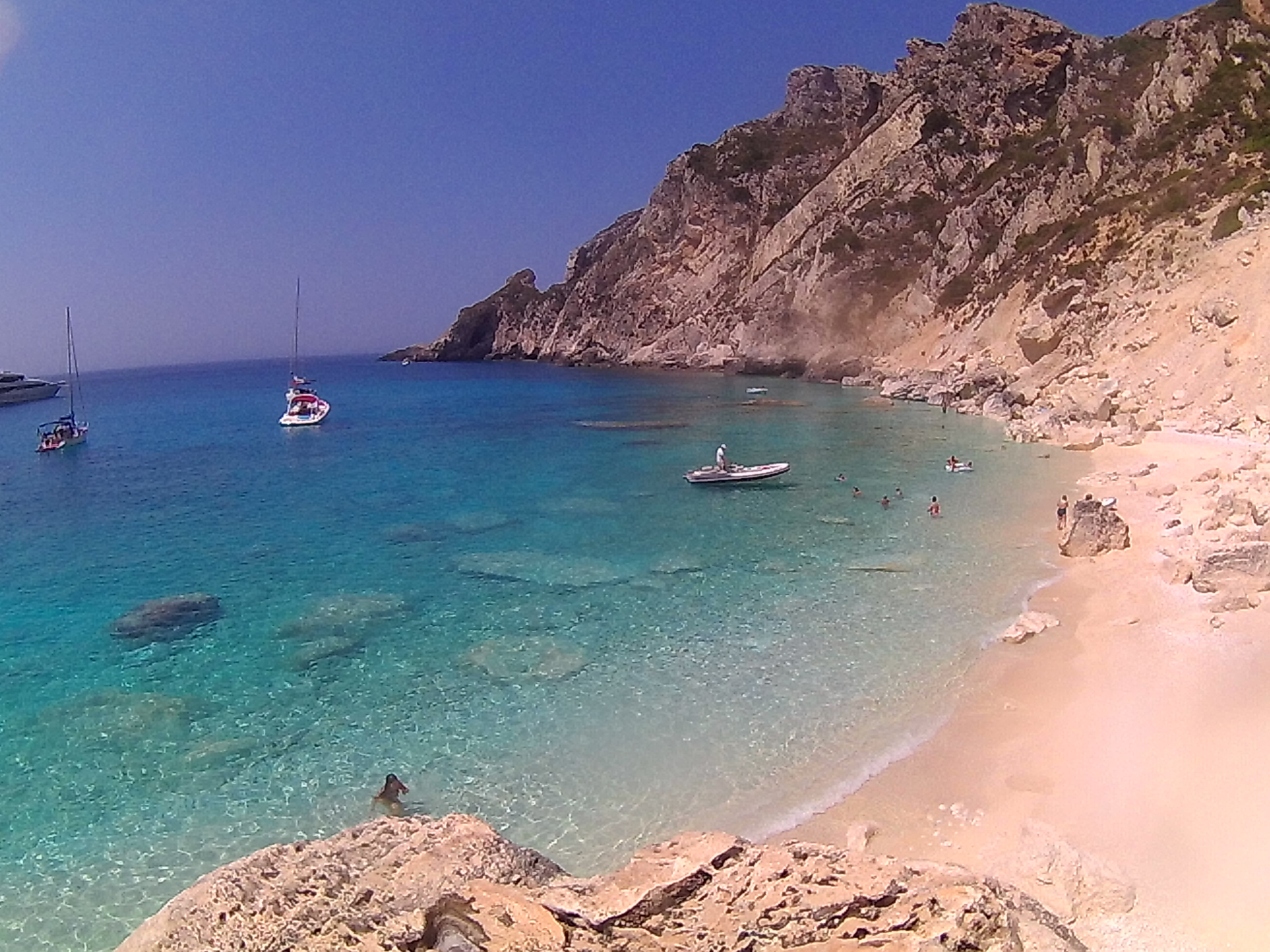
Aspri ammos beach

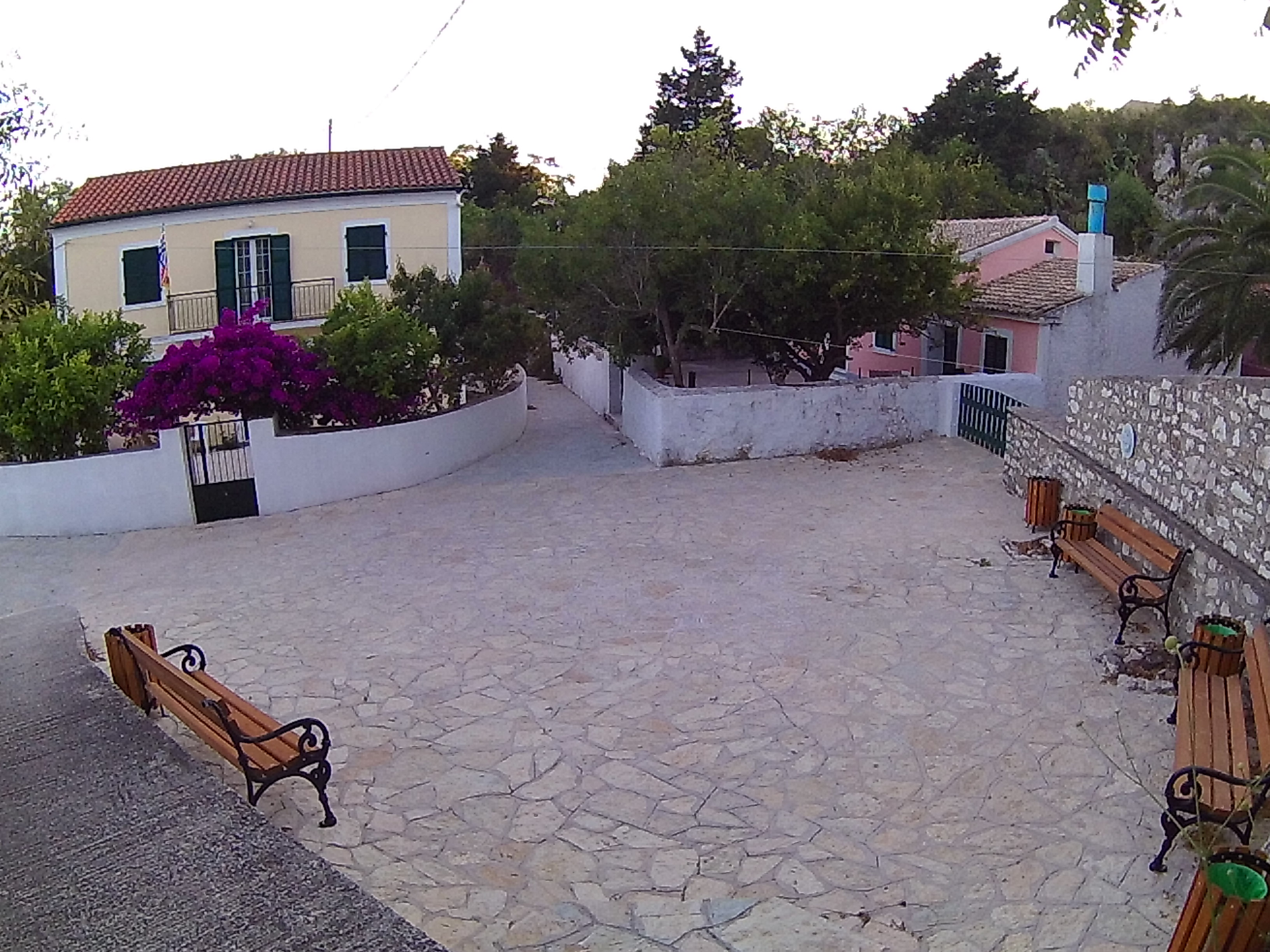
Ztrila square, Chorio

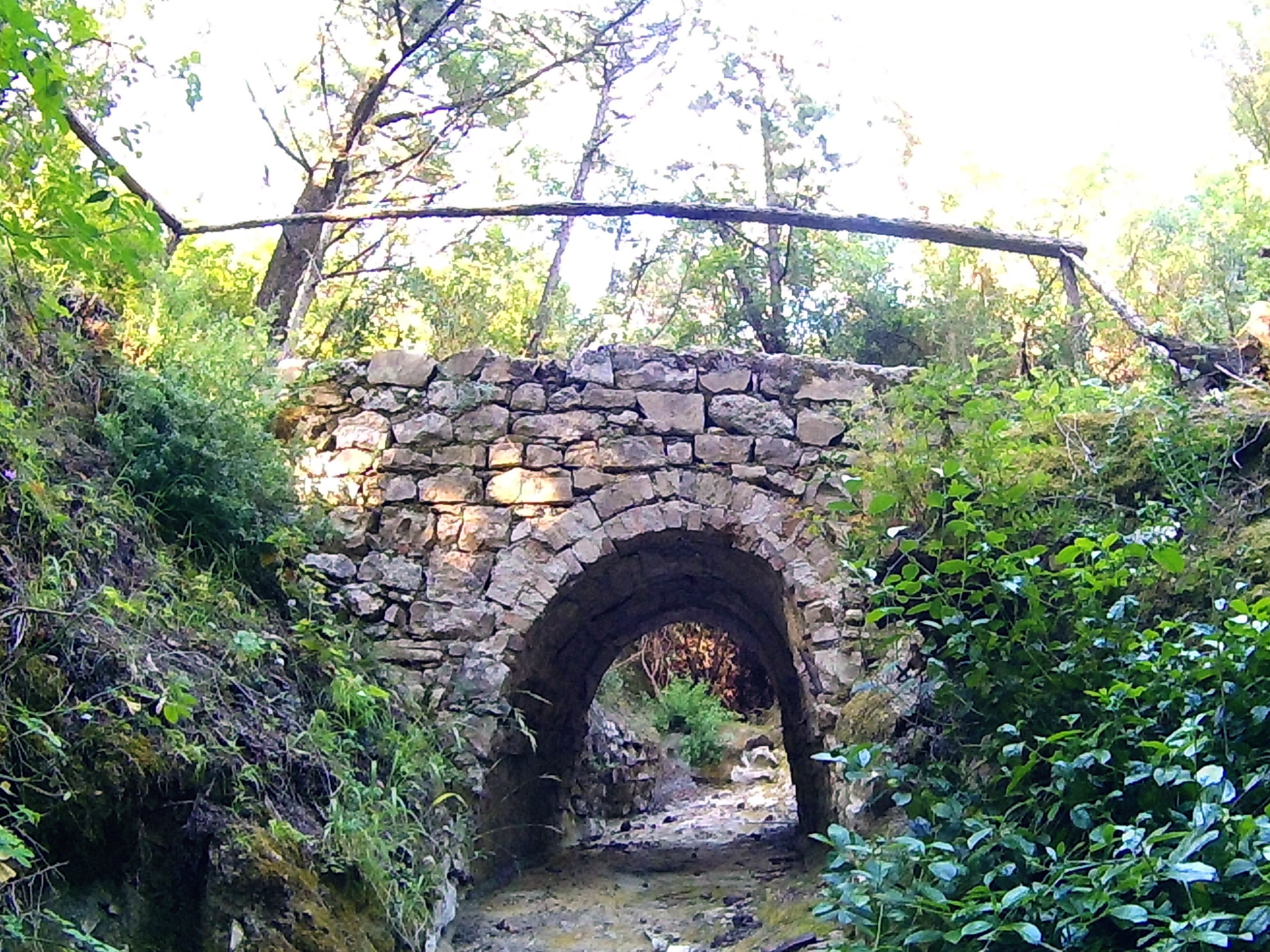
One of the old stone bridges of Othonoi

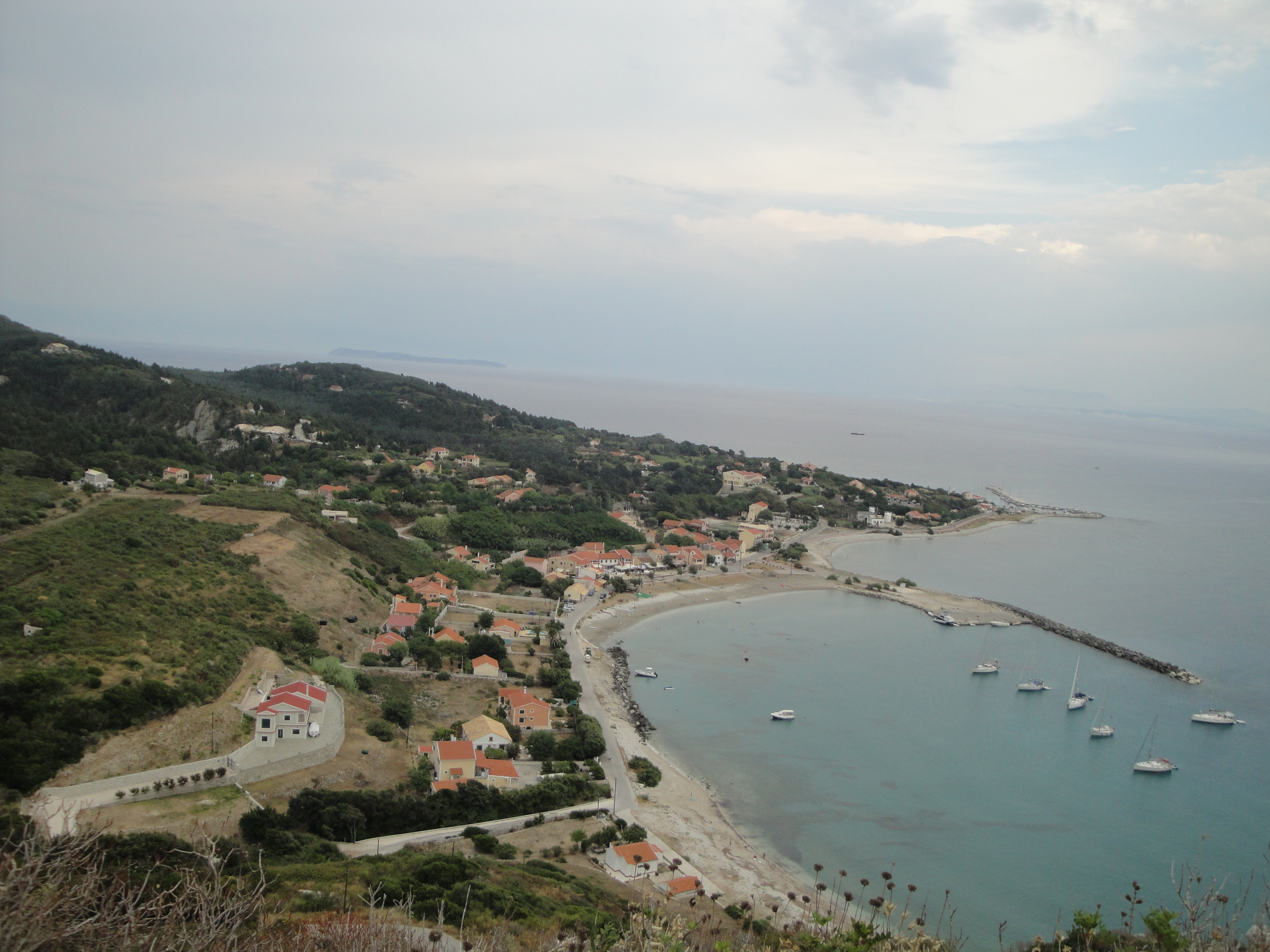
Ammos district

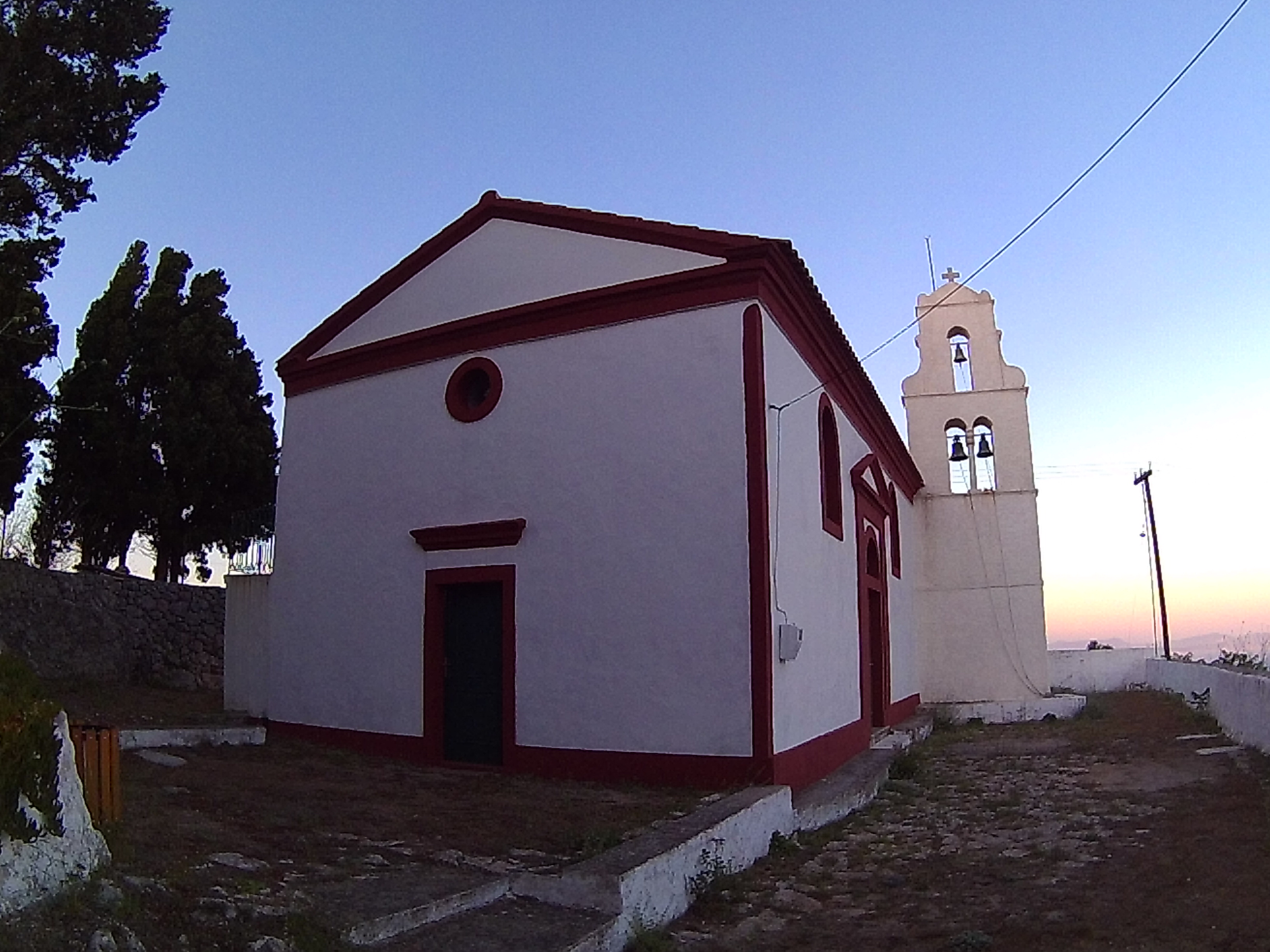
Saint George, Chorio

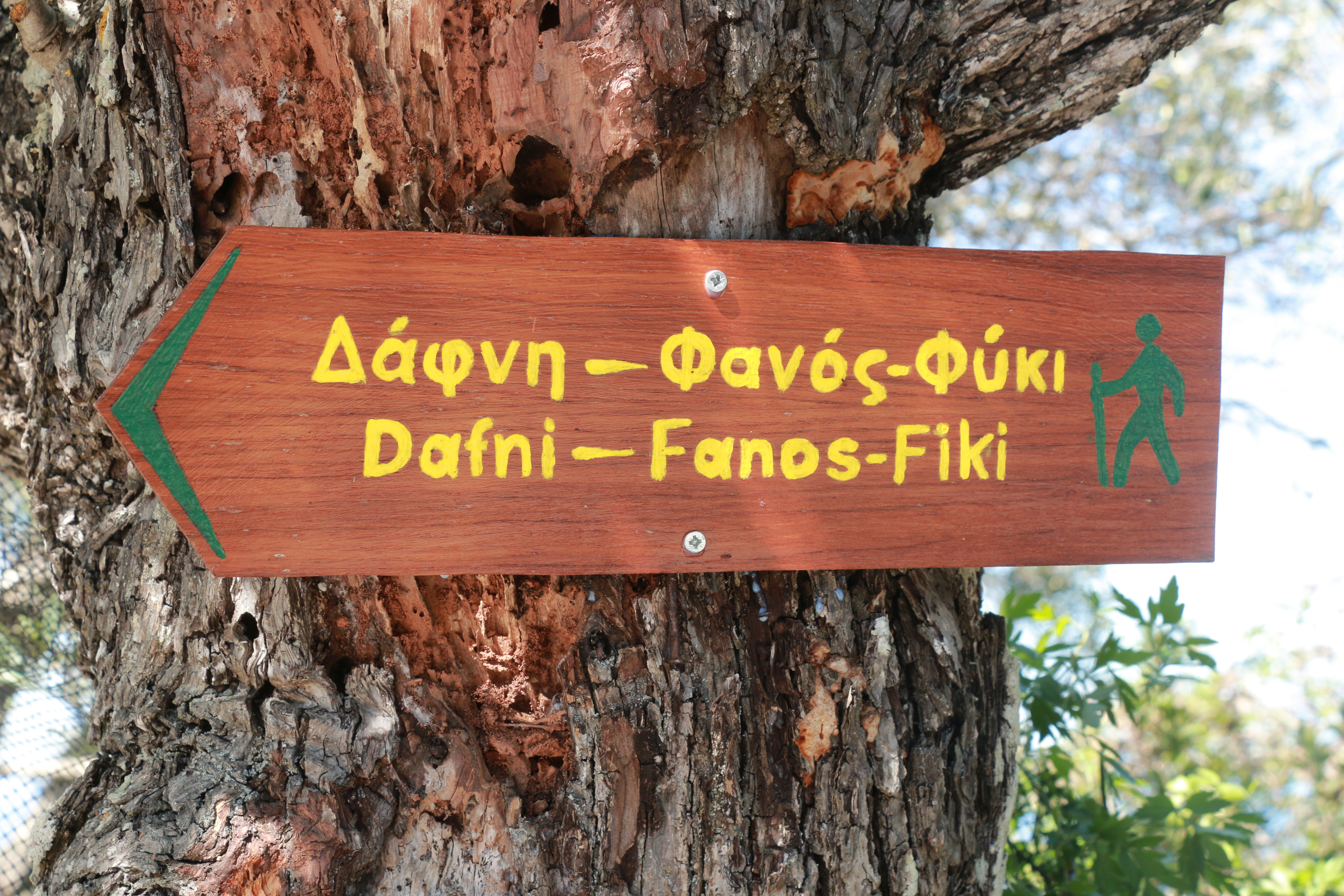
Trail sign
