= Avlakia, Othonoi =

Avlakia Αυλάκια
- Settlement
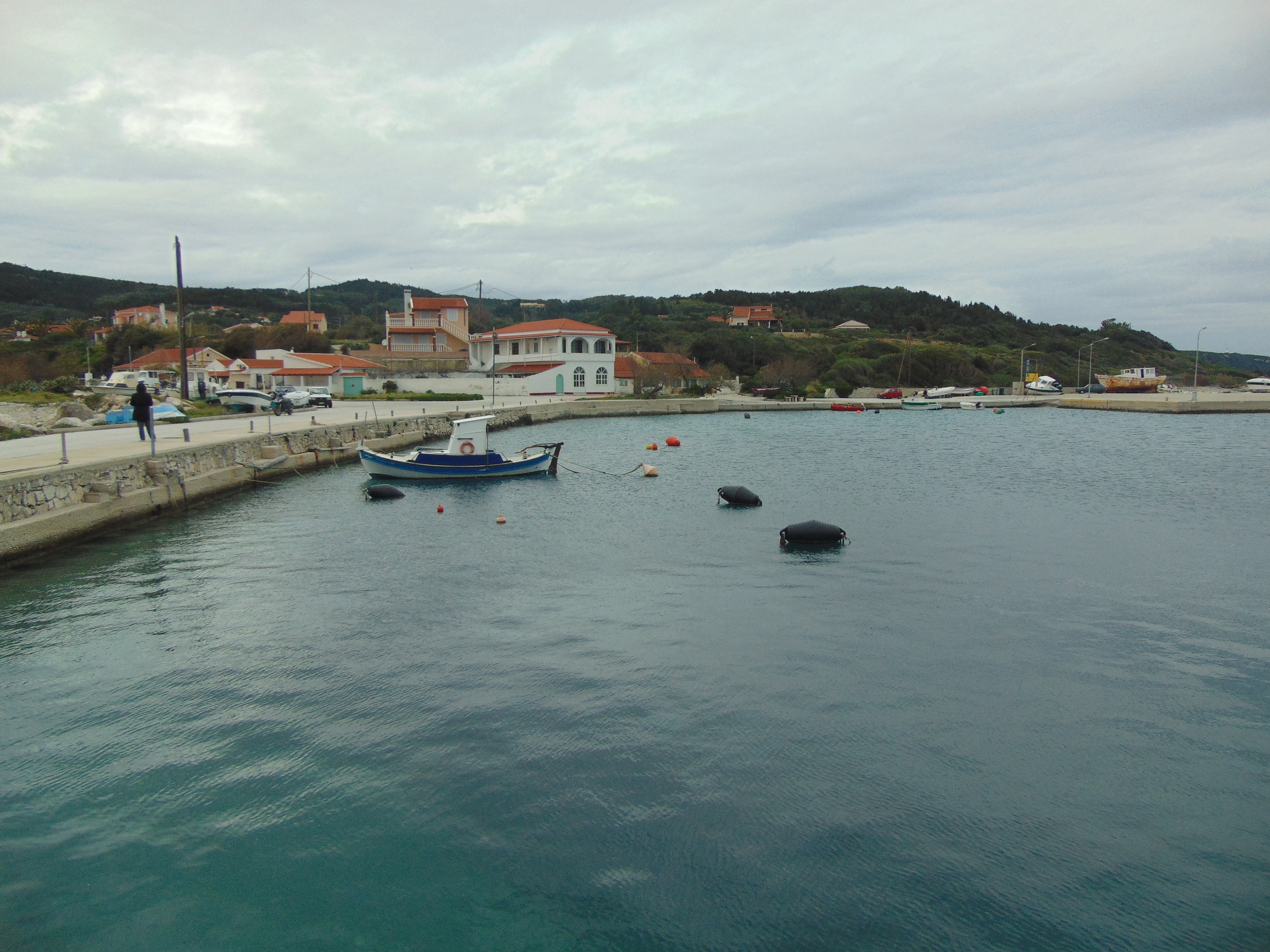
- Avlakia

- Location within Greece
- Country: Greece
- Geographic region: Ionian Islands
- Administrative region: Corfu
- Regional unit: Diapontia Islands
- Time zone: UTC+2 (EET)
  - Summer (DST): UTC+3 (EEST)
- Postal codes: 49100
- Telephone: +30 26630
- Vehicle registration: KY
- Patroness: Virgin Mary (15 August)
- Website: www.diapontia.gr

Avlakia (Greek: Αυλάκια) is a settlement on the island of Othonoi, Greece. A fishing port is located in Avlakia.
