= Ammos, Othonoi =

Ammos Άμμος
- Settlement
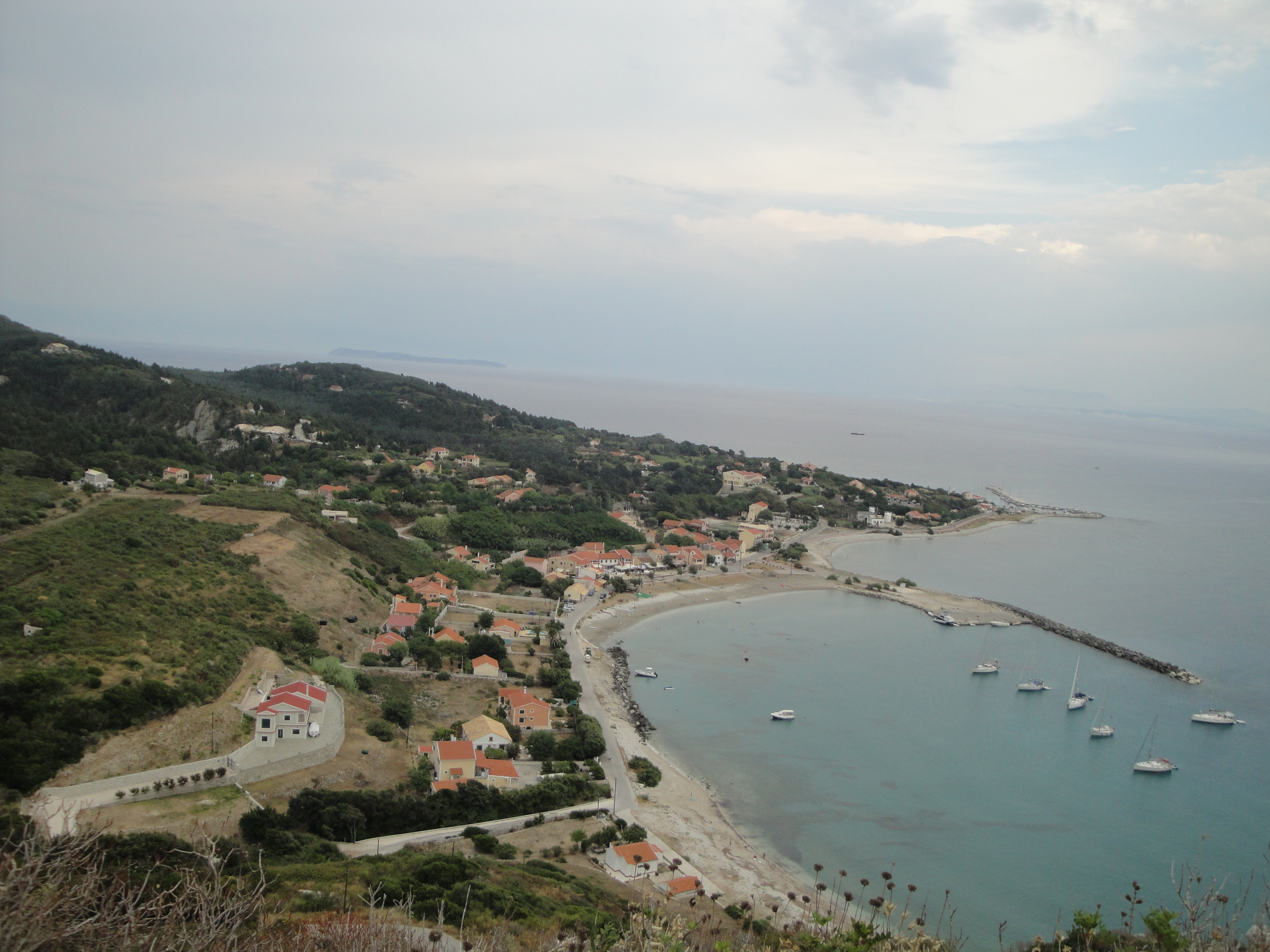
- Ammos district

- Location within Greece
- Coordinates: 39°51′N 19°24′E
- Country: Greece
- Archipelago: Diapontian Islands
- Administrative region: Ionian Islands
- Regional unit: Corfu
- Municipality: Central Corfu and Diapontian Islands
- Municipal unit: Othonoi

Population (2021)
  - Total: 206
- Time zone: UTC+2 (EET)
  - Summer (DST): UTC+3 (EEST)
- Postal code: 49100
- Telephone: +30 26630
- Vehicle registration: KY
- Patroness: Virgin Mary (15 August)
- Website: www.diapontia.gr

Ammos (Greek: Άμμος) is a settlement on the island of Othonoi, Greece. Ammos is the main port of the island. Ammos is the most populous settlement with small guesthouses, restaurants, rent-a-bike store, cafes, police station, community clinic with ambulance and port authority. There are also the Holy Trinity church (Greek: Εκκλησία Αγίας Τριάδος) (1892), the School of Othonoi (1912), the monument to the seafarers of Othonoi, and the monument to the World War II-era submarine Protefs.
