= Hellenic Seaplanes =

Greek aviation company

- Founded: 28 May 2013
- Hubs: Corfu
- Secondary hubs: Paxos; Antipaxos; Mathraki; Ereikoussa; Othonoi; Patras; Ioannina
- Destinations: 8
- Headquarters: Kallithea, Greece
- Key people: Nicolas Charalambous; President & C.E.O.
- Website: hellenic-seaplanes.com

Hellenic Seaplanes (Greek Υδροπλάνα Ελλάδας Α.Ε.) is a seaplane company in Greece with its own maintenance, training, flight operations and water aerodrome development strategy. The company's headquarters are in Kallithea, Athens, the fleet's maintenance base is at the Megara General Aviation Airport and soon will operate connecting all Greek Islands to the mainland.

The company said in 2020 that it aimed to fly from port to port among the islands, coastal cities of central Greece and lakes throughout the country, providing transportation and tourism services.

== History ==
Hellenic Seaplanes S.A. was established in May 2013 in Athens, by Nicolas Charalambous, following the passing of bill 4146/2013 that set out the framework for water aerodrome and seaplane operations in Greece.

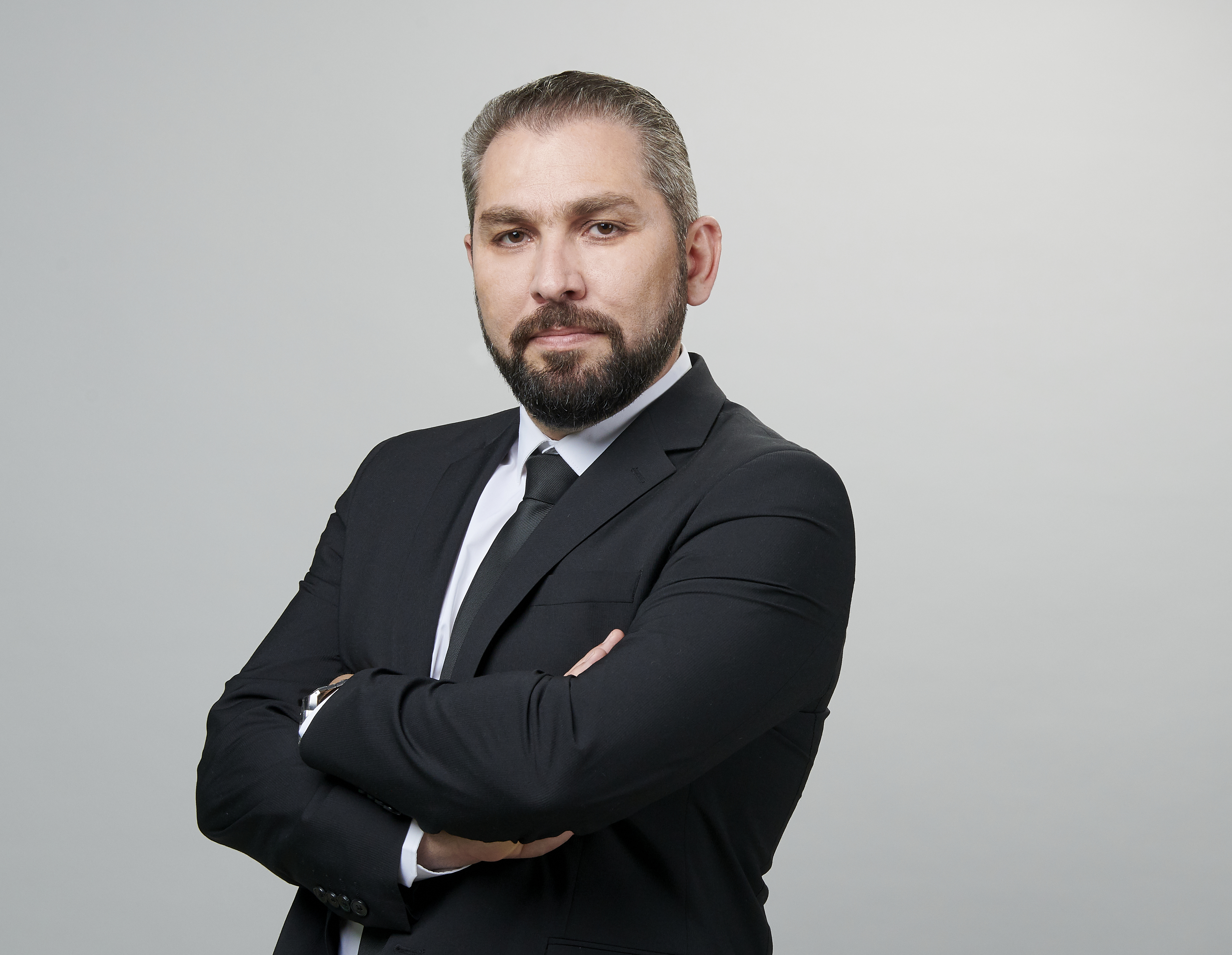
The CEO of Hellenic Seaplanes, Nicolas Charalampous.

The airline's logo is a stylized depiction of a seagull, a bird with a fusiform body that, like a seaplane, can float on water and fly through the air. The blue hues of the logo refer to the national colours of Greece, while Hellenic Seaplanes' tagline "Connecting Greece" reflects the company's mission to fly from port to port, connecting Greek islands and destinations with the mainland through its fleet of seaplanes.

== Services ==
The company will generate revenues from the provision of the following products and services:

- Scheduled flights
- Sightseeing flights
- Charter and private flights
- Resort transfers
- Freight and courier services
- Medical evacuation (Medevac services)

== Seaplanes fleet ==
Hellenic Seaplane's fleet consists of the following aircraft:

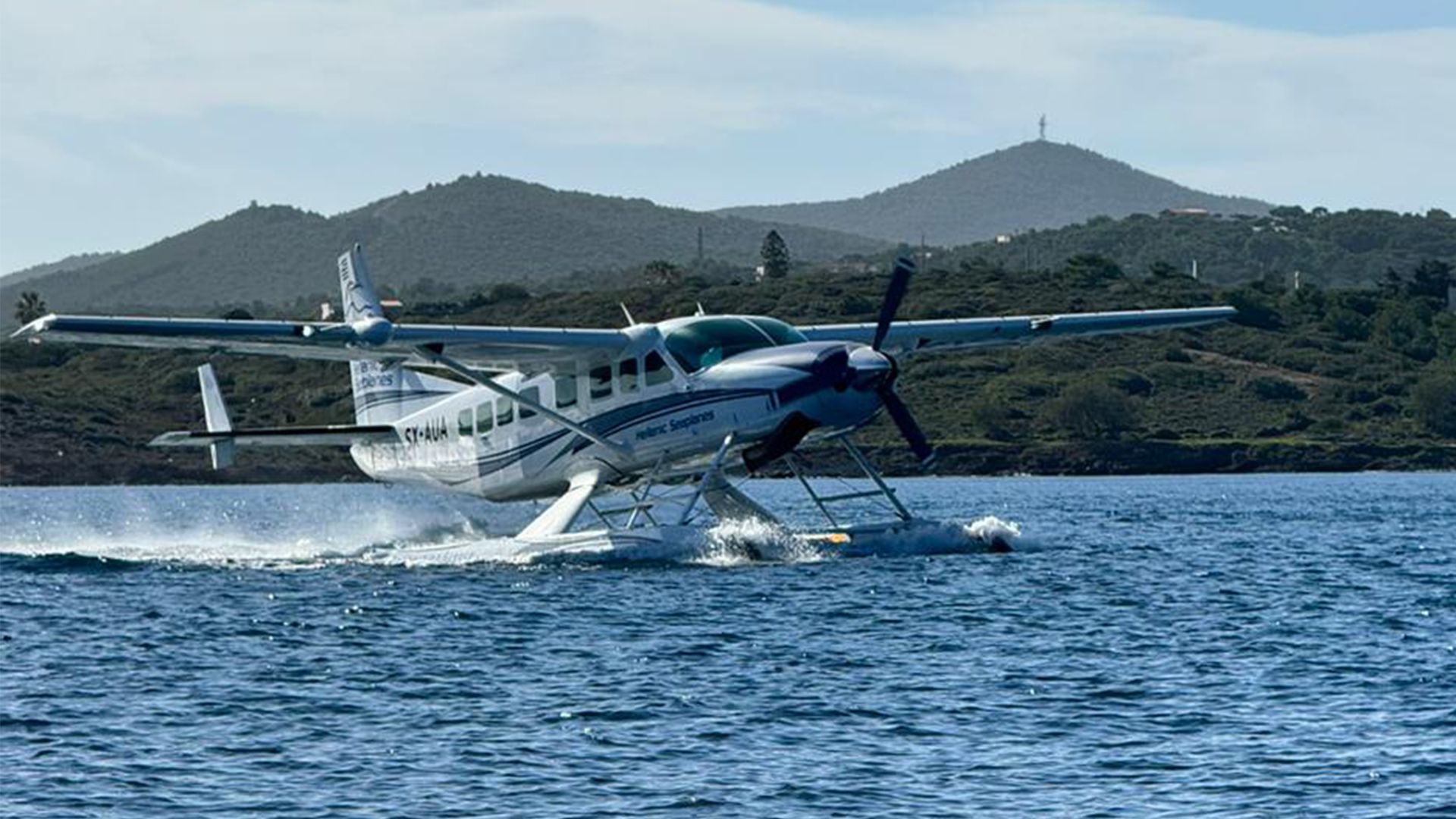
Hellenic Seaplanes' aircraft Cessna Caravan C208

=== Cessna 208 Caravan ===
Hellenic Seaplanes' aircraft Cessna 208 Caravan is an amphibian seaplane. It is a light turboprop single-engine aircraft known for its ease of handling. This specific seaplane travels at a speed of 270–320 km/h (170–200 mph) and its capacity includes seats for up to 12 passengers.

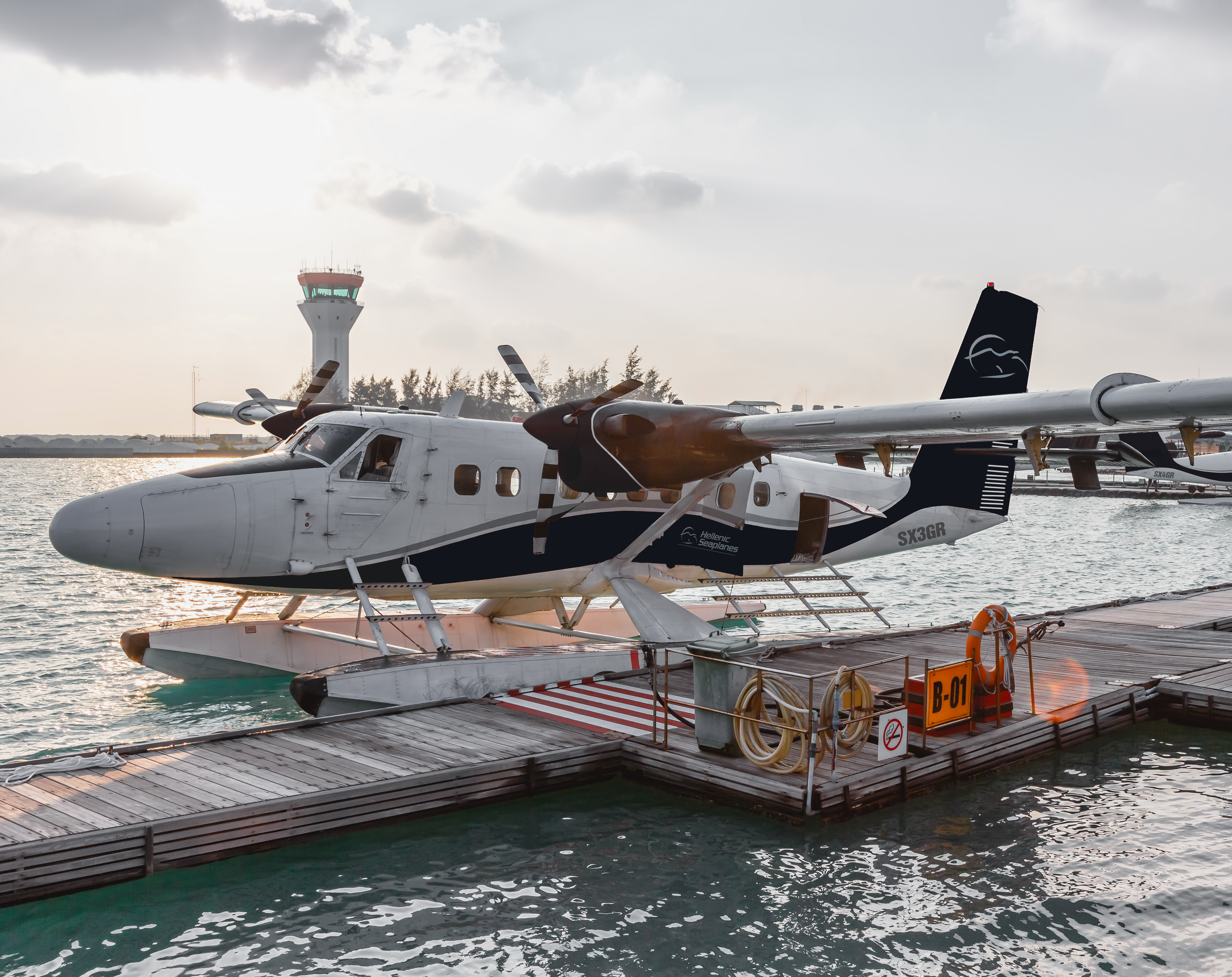
Hellenic Seaplanes' aircraft Viking DHC-6 Twin Otter

=== de Havilland Canada DHC-6 Twin Otter ===
Hellenic Seaplanes' de Havilland Canada DHC-6 Twin Otter is an amphibian seaplane, with a capacity of 19 passenger seats which develops travel speed of up to 300 km/h (190 mph). It is a high-blade aircraft, with two turbine engines and is considered to be the most suitable aircraft to be operating at sea and in all climate conditions.

== Seaplane operations ==
Starting from summer 2024, Hellenic Seaplanes will offer a variety of aerial sightseeing tours over Corfu and the surrounding islands, such as Paxos, Antipaxos and the Diapontian Islands (Mathraki, Ereikoussa, Othonoi islands).

Hellenic Seaplanes will also offer scheduled flights between Corfu and Paxos. The seaplane company will provide charter flights to a variety of water airports, water fields and airports in the Ionian Sea, Peloponnese and Western Greece. These flights can be customized to meet the specific needs of the customer.

Generally, Hellenic Seaplane's operations plan has been placed around ten geographic regions which are as follows:

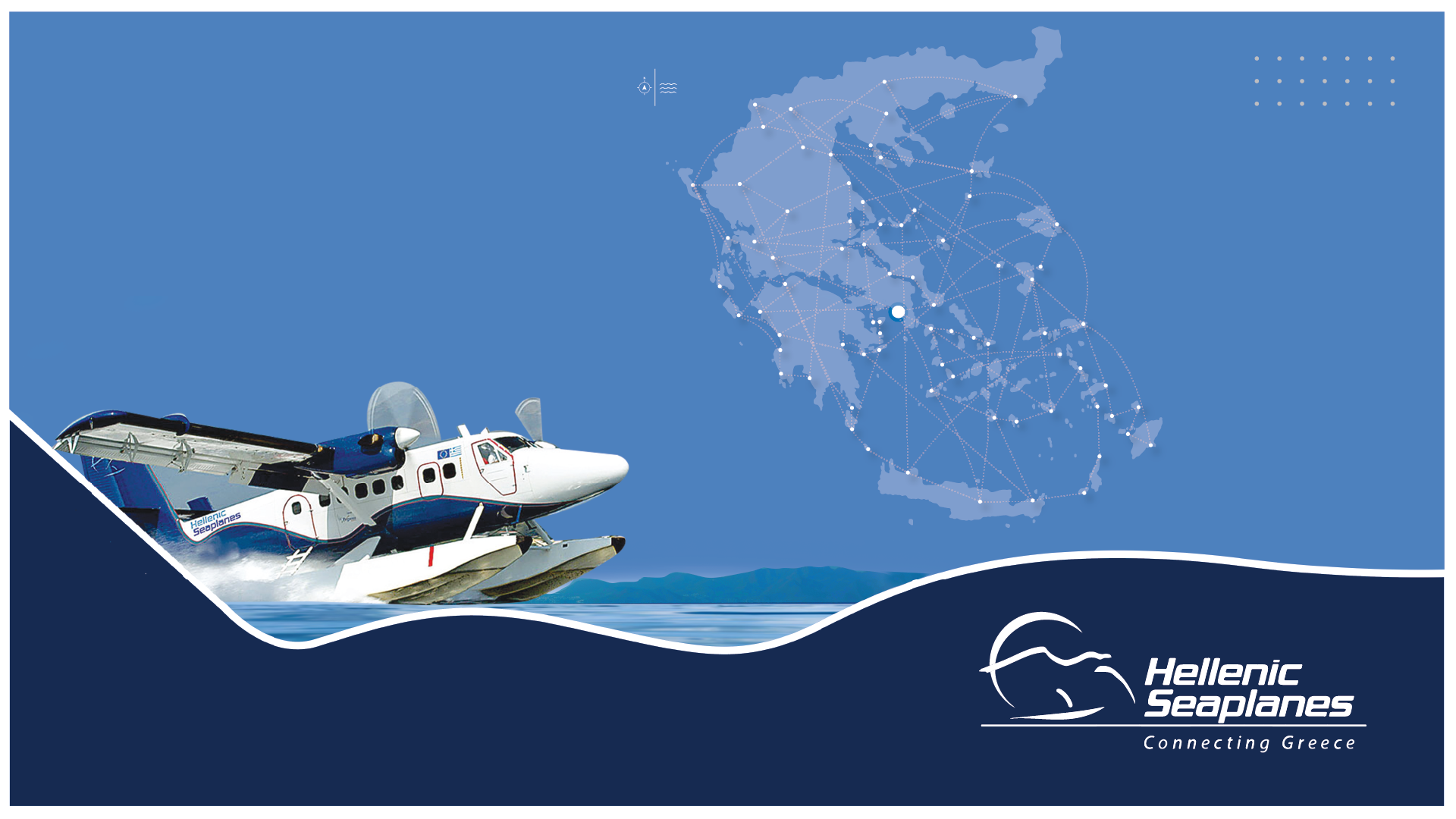
Hellenic Seaplanes map of operations

- Region 1 – Central Greece – Attica
- Region 2 – Crete
- Region 3 – Thrace – North Aegean islands
- Region 4 – Macedonia
- Region 5 – Epirus
- Region 6 – Dodecanese islands
- Region 7 – Peloponnese
- Region 8 – Ionian Islands – Western Greece
- Region 9 – Cyclades islands
- Region 10 – Thessaly
