= Christodoulos Aronis =

Greek artist, professor and priest

Christodoulos Aronis was a Greek fine artist, professor and priest who lived and worked in Greece, England and Scotland and was born in Paxi.

== Life ==
Christodoulos Aronis was born in 1884 in the village of Dendiatika, on the island of Paxos, Greece (see Paxi).

He graduated from the Athens School of Fine Arts in 1912, receiving its second highest prize, and then went on to become a painter, professor and a priest. He lived and worked for many years as a minister at St Luke's Orthodox Cathedral, Glasgow and The Greek Orthodox Cathedral of Saint Sophia (London).

He died in Corfu in 1973 and is buried in the cemetery of Taxiarhon Church in Longos, Paxos.

== Work ==
His first exhibition, of forty paintings, took place on 13 August 1967 in the hall of the Public Elementary School in Gaios. This is now the Paxos Picture Gallery, and is owned by the Municipality of Paxos.

A second exhibition was organised in December 1988, by the Archbishop of Corfu, in tribute to Aronis’s memory.

The Paxos Picture Gallery was inaugurated by the artist’s daughter, Titina Aroni-Patra, on 26 November 1999, when Mrs Aroni-Patra presented her father’s paintings to the Picture Gallery. In 2006, her husband presented another seven of the artist’s paintings to the Gallery, in memory of his late wife.

Aronis specialised in religious painting, the figure, and landscapes. Many of his commissions can be found in churches on Paxos and Corfu, and also the Greek Orthodox Cathedral of St Luke in Glasgow . One of his most famous icons is located in the left wing of The Greek Orthodox Cathedral of Saint Sophia of Divine Wisdom in London. Aronis donated many of his paintings to the parish of Longos, Paxos, where he is buried.
