= Aronis =

Aronis is a surname. Notable people with the surname include:

- Antonios Aronis (born 1957), Greek water polo player
- Christodoulos Aronis (1884-1973), Greek fine artist, professor, and priest
