= Matraxia =

Matraxia, is an Italian family name, found primarily in Sicily and specifically in Caltanisetta and the nearby area.

== Origins ==
Matraxia is one of the common Sicilian surnames of Greek origins. It's probably from the name of the dorian island Mathraki, one of the islands from which Dorians departed in order to create the famous Magna Graecia

== Distribution ==
Italy and USA
