= Tracheia =

Τραχεῖα/Tracheia, meaning "rugged" in Greek, was used as a toponym for several entities

- Ancient fortress on the shore of the Black Sea, sometimes identified with Anacopia (modern New Athos)
- Uninhabited island belonging to Diapontia Islands
- Cilicia Tracheia, a part of Cilicia

== See also ==
- trachea for the windpipe.
