= Ereikoussa =

Greek island in the Ionian Sea

Ereikoussa Ερείκουσα
- Municipal unit
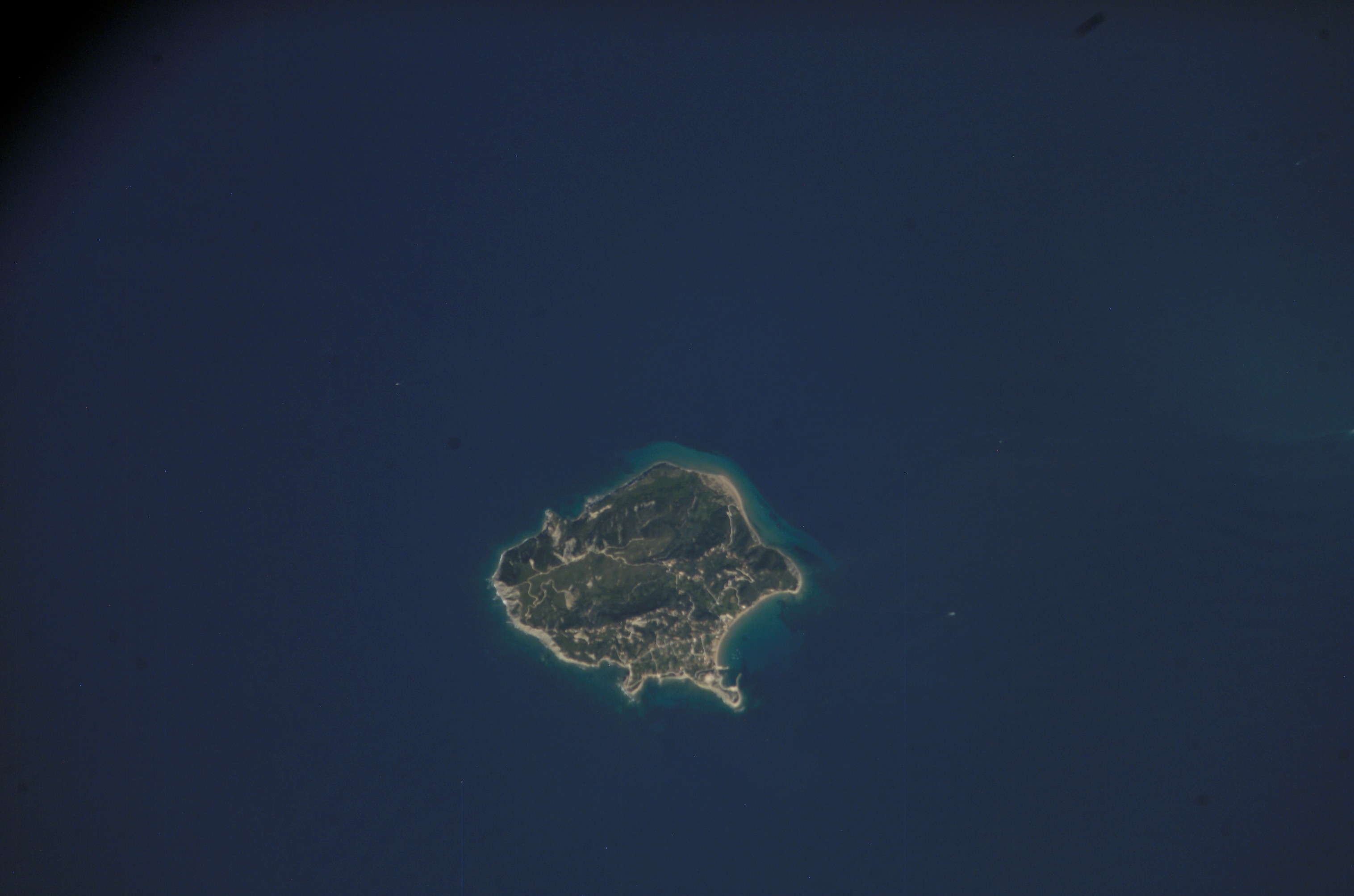

- Location within the regional unit

- Location within Greece
- Coordinates: 39°53′N 19°35′E
- Country: Greece
- Administrative region: Ionian Islands
- Regional unit: Corfu
- Municipality: Central Corfu and Diapontian Islands

Area
  - Municipal unit: 4.449 km^{2} (1.718 sq mi)

Population (2021)
  - Municipal unit: 447
  - Municipal unit density: 100/km^{2} (260/sq mi)
- Time zone: UTC+2 (EET)
  - Summer (DST): UTC+3 (EEST)
- Website: www.diapontia.gr

Ereikoussa (Greek: Ερείκουσα) is an island and a former community of the Ionian Islands, Greece. It is one of the Diapontian Islands; an island complex to the northwest of Corfu. Since the 2019 local government reform it is part of the municipality of Central Corfu and Diapontian Islands, of which it is a municipal unit. It is located off the northwestern coast of the island of Corfu, and is almost equidistant from Corfu to the southeast, Mathraki to the southwest, and Othonoi to the west. Its population was 447 in the 2021 census, and its land area is 3.65 square kilometres (1 sq mi). The municipal unit has an area of 4.449 km^{2}. It has six settlements; the main one is Porto (Πόρτο), which is also where the only port is located. The island has dense vegetation and three beaches; Porto (Πόρτο), Bragini (Μπραγκίνι), and Fiki (Φύκι). The name Ereikoussa derives from the plant ereíki (ερείκη), which can be found throughout the island.
