= Diapontian Islands =

Greek island group

Native name: Διαπόντια Νησιά/Νησιά Οθωνοί
- Location within Greece

Geography
- Location: Ionian Sea
- Coordinates: 39.84°N 19.50°E
- Archipelago: Ionian Islands
- Total islands: 12
- Area: 17.65 km^{2} (6.81 sq mi)
- Highest elevation: 393 m (1289 ft)
- Highest point: Imerovigli, Othoni

Administration
- Greece
- Region: Ionian Islands
- Regional unit: Corfu
- Municipality: Central Corfu and Diapontian Islands
- Capital: Othoni
- Demonym: Diapontian, Diapontic (el: Διαπόντιος)

Demographics
- Population: 1044 (2021)

Additional information
- Postal code: 49100
- Area code: 26630
- Vehicle registration: KY
- Official website: www.diapontia.gr

The Diapontian Islands or Diapontia Islands (Greek: Διαπόντια Νησιά, romanized: Diapóntia Nisiá, also known as Othonoi Islands (Greek: Νήσοι Οθωνοί, romanized: Nísoi Othonoí) are a Greek island group in the Ionian Sea. They are located northwest of Corfu. The main and the only inhabited islands of the archipelago are Othoni, Ereikoussa and Mathraki. The complex also includes the islets and rocks of Diakopo, Diaplo, Karavi, Kastrino, Leipso, Ostrako, Plaka, Plateia and Tracheia.

The largest island is Othoni, with an area of 10.8 km^{2}, and it is the most populated, with 457 inhabitants according to the 2021 census. The islands are the westernmost point in Greece and administratively belong to Corfu regional unit. The islands today are a tranquil place for holidays.

== Geography ==
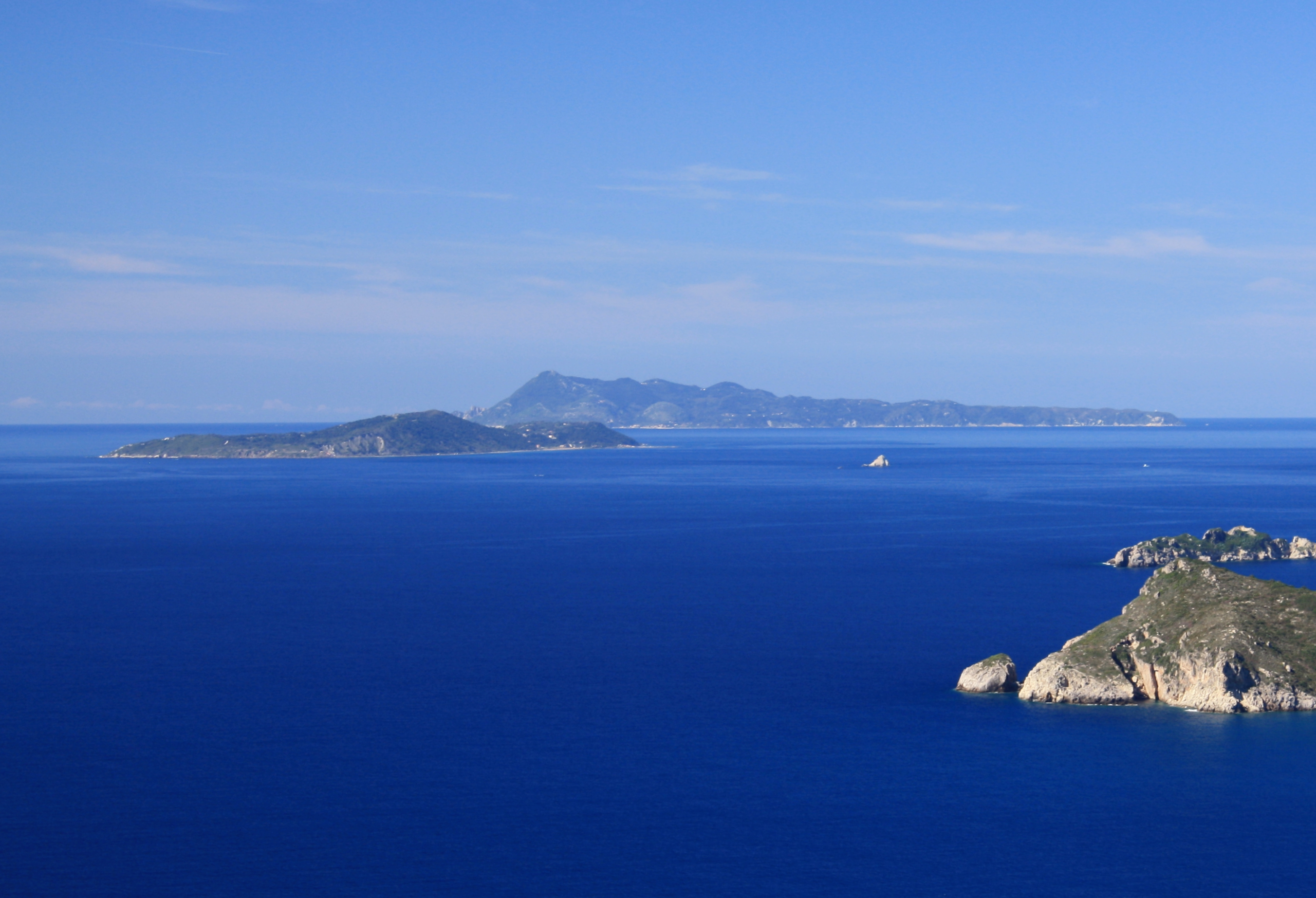
Othoni and Mathraki view from Corfu

The archipelago of Diapontia consists of 12 islands and islets.

Name in English	Name in Greek	Country
Othonoi	Οθωνοί (Othonoi)	Greece
Ereikoussa	Ερεικούσσα (Ereikoussa)	Greece
Kastrino (islet)	Καστρινό (Kastrino)	Greece
Ostrako (islet)	Όστρακο (Ostrako)	Greece
Mathraki	Μαθράκι (Mathraki)	Greece
Diakopo (islet)	Διάκοπο (Diakopo)	Greece
Diaplo (islet)	Διάπλο (Diaplo)	Greece
Karavi (islet)	Καράβι (Karavi)	Greece
Lipso (islet)	Λειψώ (Leipso)	Greece
Plaka (islet)	Πλάκα (Plaka)	Greece
Trachia (islet)	Τραχειά (Tracheia)	Greece

=== Fauna ===
==== Reptiles and amphibians ====
The first report on the herpetofauna of the islands was published in 2015.

Hemidactylus turcicus and Algyroides nigropunctatus were found on all islands. Bufotes viridis was found on Ereikoussa and Othoni, and Hierophis gemonensis on Othoni and Mathraki. Hyla arborea, Mauremys rivulata, and Malpolon insignitus were only found on Ereikoussa, and Lacerta trilineata only on Othoni.

=== Othoni ===
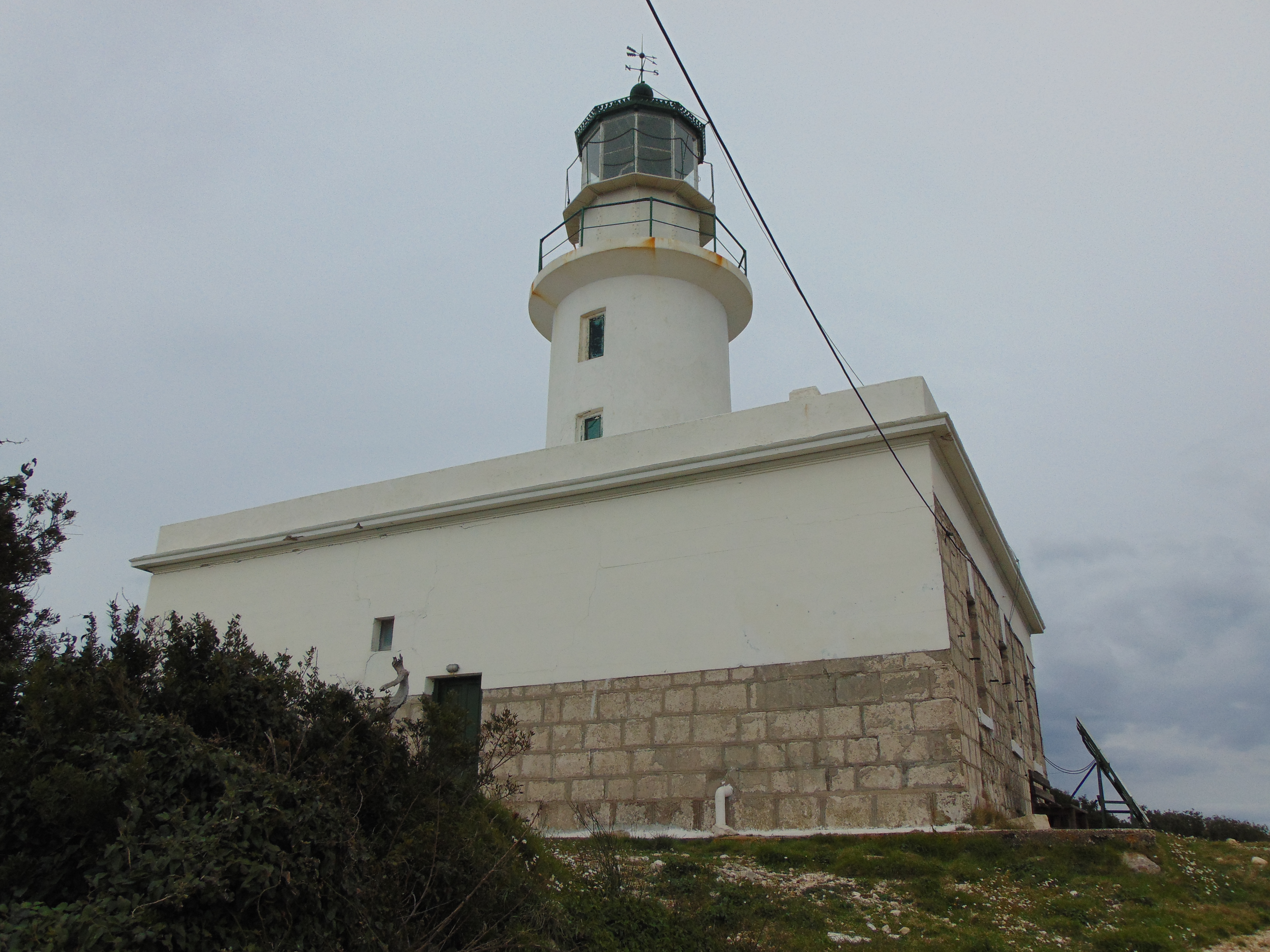
Lighthouse in Othoni

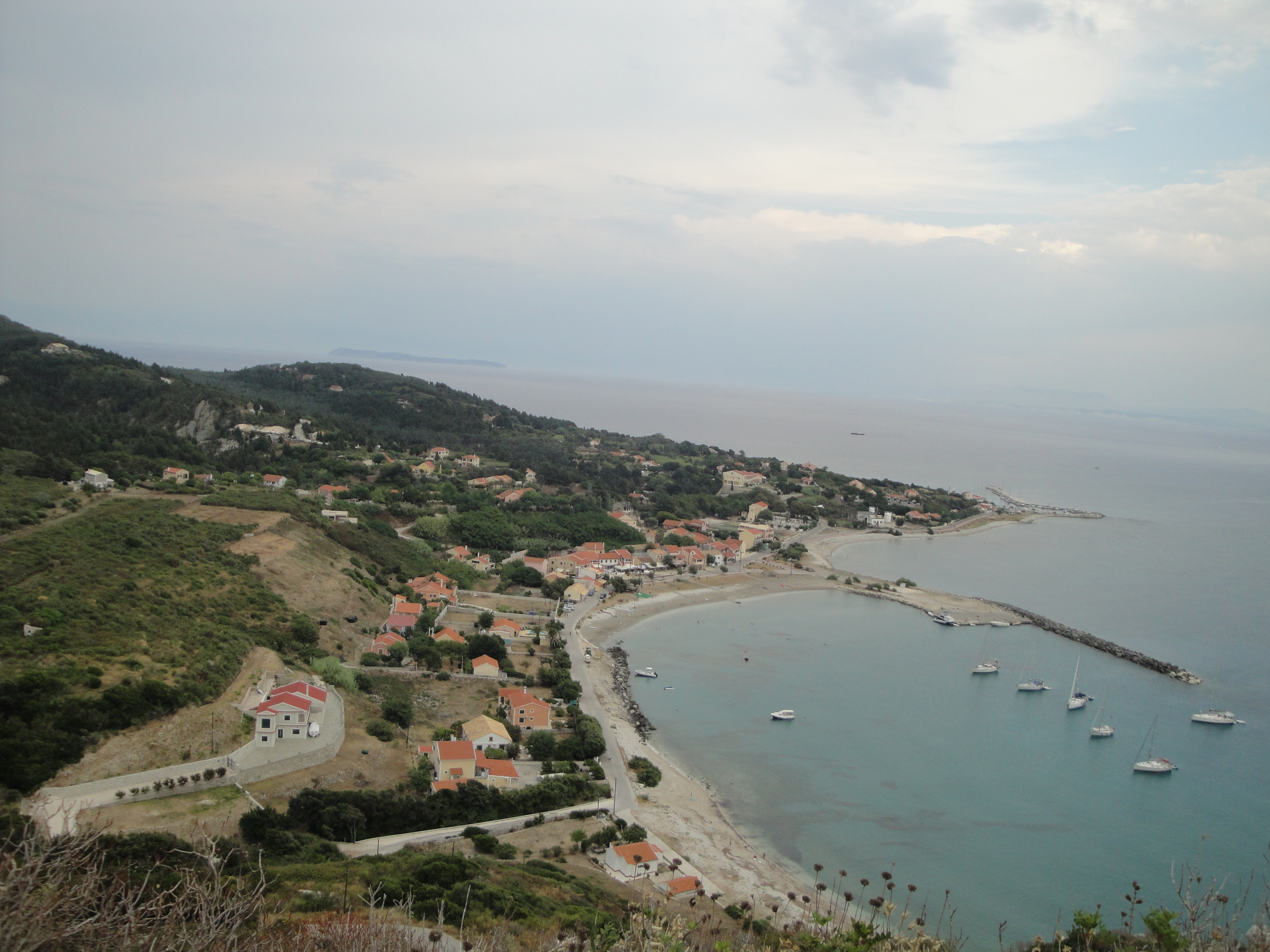
Ammos, Othonoi

Othonoi (Greek: Οθωνοί, Italian: Fanò or Othoni) is the westernmost point of Greece and the largest of the Diapontian Islands. Othoni is divided into two regions, which are Ano Panta (Greek: Άνω πάντα) and Kato Panta (Greek: Κάτω πάντα). There are more than 20 settlements. In the 19th century the island was the capital of the Diapontian Islands municipality, which also included Ereikoussa and Mathraki. Othoni is about 47 nautical miles from Santa Maria di Leuca cape, Italy. In Akro Kastri is an active 19th century lighthouse.

=== Ereikoussa ===
Ereikoussa (Greek: Ερείκουσσα, Italian: Merlera) is the second most populated island of Diapontia after Othonoi. It is the northernmost island in the group, almost equidistant from Corfu to the southeast, Mathraki to the southwest, and Othonoi to the west. The only town on the island, also named Ereikoussa, had a population of 366 at the 2021 census. Its land area is 3.65 square kilometres (1 sq mi), while the municipal unit has an area of 4.449 km^{2}. The island is rich in green forests, filled with cypress, and olive trees. It has two beaches, Porto (Πόρτο) and Braghini (Μπραγκίνι); the names are of Italian origin, and date back to the period of Venetian rule. Braghini is rarely visited because it is further away from the main part of the island.

=== Mathraki ===
Mathraki (Greek: Μαθράκι, older form: Μαθράκιον) municipal unit has an area of 3.532 km^{2} and a population of 329 (2011). Mathraki is a 45-minute boat ride off the coast of Corfu (4 NM from Cape Arilas). It has three restaurants that double as general stores, villas and "rooms to let". Mathraki is a quiet island that manages to stay clear of tourists except for the occasional hikers that brave the rocky coastline. The municipal unit includes the three nearby islets Diakopo, Diaplo and Tracheia.

== History ==
At the beginning of the second millennium, the Diapontian islands were conquered alternatively by the Franks (the 11th century) and the Venetians (12th century), and often attacked by pirates of Barbary and Algeria. From the end of 1383 until 1386 the domination of Corfu brought by Charles III of Naples. In his letter he stated that on April 19, 1383 granted the usufruct of Othoni Ereikoussa, Mathraki, Diapolo and Vido, the knight Theodore Skaliti as fief. In 1537, the Turkish fleet under the command of Greek origin pirate and admiral Hayreddin Barbarossa massacred the inhabitants of Othoni island after a long battle. In Stavros district at an altitude of 217 m. a white stone cross exists until today to commemorate that event.

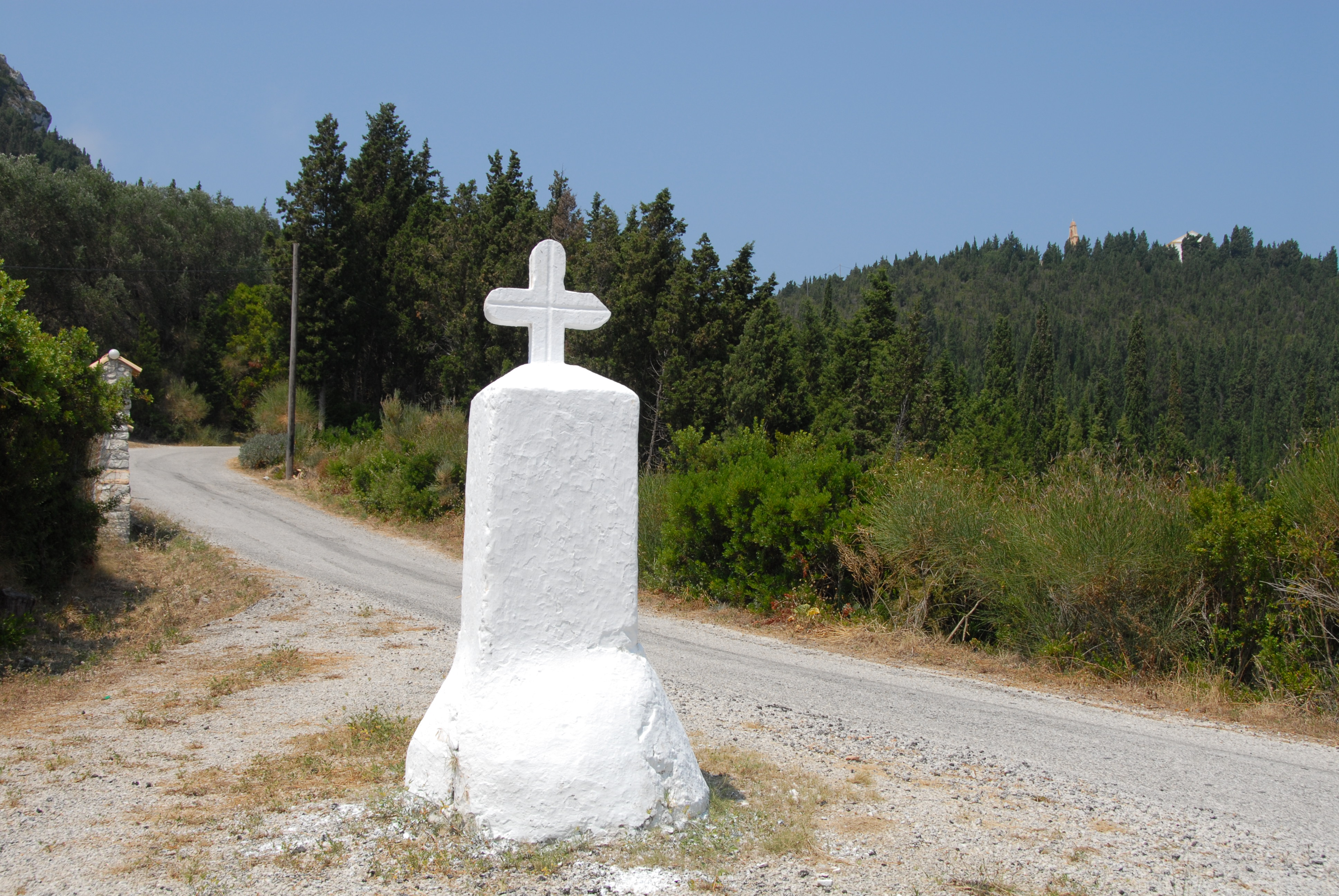
Cross on Kalodiki hill, Stavros, Othoni.

The last settlers of Othoni apparently came from Paxos and Ioannina, Parga and the region of Epirus. Dated after the Battle of Nafpaktos in 1571, when the Turkish fleet was destroyed and the islanders began to move more safely. After the last movement, the residents of Othoni island colonized the two other small islands, Ereikoussa and Mathraki. In 1815, the English conquered Othonoi and as is said, sent to the island sick soldiers to recover because of the good climate that prevailed. The Treaty signed on March 29, 1864 between the three powers (England, France, Russia) and the Kingdom of Greece, the Ionian Islands -and Diapontian islands- passed definitively to Greek sovereignty on 21 May. On October 5, 1864, the Ionian Parliament realized the purpose of the convocation solemnly acting union with Greece as one and indivisible state under king, George I of Greece. From 1869 until 1912 Othoni, Ereikousa and Mathraki formed the municipality of Dimos Diapontion with Othoni as capital.

=== Naval history ===
Diapontians achieved big naval and maritime history. A lot of men were involved in shipping (1880-1990). It is significant that there is no Diapontian family without a sailor. Also, many Diapontians were senior crews in Hellenic war ships. Main maritime occupations was sailor, boatswain, master or engineer of any class. There were also many ship owners as they had a large number of yachts and commercial steamships traveling to many Mediterranean ports. Unfortunately, within these decades of history that Diapontians wrote at sea, there were some victims because of several wrecks due to sloppiness and carelessness of those responsible in the last century. Today, there are plenty of fishing and speed boats owned by Diapontians in every island.

==== Sinking of submarine Proteus ====
On 29 December 1940, the Greek submarine Proteus sank in the sea area of Othoni. The submarine had attacked an Italian convoy carrying ammunition to Vlorë. After sinking the steamer Sardegna, the submarine was rammed by the Italian torpedo boat Antares. The loss of the submarine was the first loss of the Greek Navy in World War II. A monument to honor the memory of the crew, was inaugurated in Othoni on June 15, 2015.

== Mythology ==
According to mythology, in the ancient times, Othoni was the island of nymph Calypso, who lived in a large cave. Odysseus fell in love and remained like a prisoner there for seven years. Homer called this island Ogygia who wrote there was a strong scent of cypress on Ogygia island. Odysseus left the island by a raft and he sank on Scheria, the island of Corfu . According to Hesychius, after the Trojan War, Elephenor, king of Avantes from Euboea fled to the island after the fall of Troy, to atone as he had killed his grandfather, Abas.

== Origin of Diapontians ==
The traditional aspect of the local population is that their roots are from Epirus region and Paxos as many diapontian surnames are common with Epirote, Northern Epirus and Paxos surnames (e.x Argyros, Mastoras etc.) and it's a common opinion that their roots seem to be Epirotic, Arvanitic, Aromanian and from Paxos without forgetting the Italian and Venetian influence. The main point of view of the most Diapontians the last century is that families from Paxos and Epirus immigrated Othoni. Also, the surnames around Diapontia are in some cases completely the same on each island as many Othonians immigrated the other two islands after immigrated Othoni leaving Paxos or Epurus. There are also many villages of Diapontian Islands which have the same names with some of Paxos and Epirus (Deletatika, Argyratika etc.)

The Diapontians organized and created villages based on their relatives, that is, each village includes relatives. Each village has people related to the other villages and almost all the islanders are related to each other. With few exceptions, each village bears the name of the family surname that resides there like in Paxos. (e.g. from the adjective Argyros, Argyratika etc.) For this reason, the Diapontians shared the same surnames. They had to bring their surnames and family nicknames so that they could stand out from each other. The nicknames in this case give the origin and the properties of each family. Most of them are hellenized-Italian, Latinized-Greek, Epirotic and Vlach.

The reasons of the migration to Diapontia are not entirely clear and may be manifold. The main reason seems to be the need of the islands in labor in agriculture. Waves of migration in Diapontia started around 1600, reached a peak some time during the 19th century, and ended around 1800 reaching Othoni starting from Ano Panta, then Ereikousa and Mathraki. Chorio seems to be the first settlement of Othoni and refers until today as "the capital of the island". The folklorist-anthropologist and specialist in Greek folklore Dimitrios Loukatos documented that the Diapontians origin had for sure connections with Epirus and Paxos as during his research on Diapontian Islands in 1960's found similarities between the traditional life and costumes of Diapontians with Epirots and that they are not exactly the same with the Corfiots.

The last decades the connections with Epirus and Paxos are not so many as before. The islands are completely connected with Corfu as the most many Diapontians are living in Corfu and as result some of them consider themselves to be of Corfu origin. Many Diapontians emigrated to the USA during the 20th century and they have American citizenship. There are also many diapontian surnames and toponyms that have British, Italian and Venetian routes.

== Dialect ==
A dialect is spoken resembling that of Corfu and having a similar prosody but is not completely the same as many diapontian words are completely different to that of Corfu. It is heavily influenced by Italian and Epirotic.

== Diaspora ==
From the beginning of 60's many Diapontians decided to emigrate to US, Canada and Germany due to unemployment in the Diapontian islands. There are over 300 Erikoussian families in New York. The Diapontians of North America had established their own societies and every island has its own one. In Montgomery, Alabama the house of one Othonian seaman called Alexandros Markou Kasimis was designated by the US authorities as a preservable monument as it seems that he was one of the first Greek immigrants in USA. There are plenty of Diapontians in Montgomery today. From the beginning of 20th century many Diapontians had emigrated to the Bronx. There are about 50 Othonian families living in Pennsylvania. Othonians of USA established in 1966 their own society called "Society of Calypso Island of Othoni Kerkyras". In 1977, renamed as "Othonian society of USA".

== Transport ==
Diapontia are accessible by ferries with services from Corfu port and Agios Stefanos Avliotes. They have heliports for emergencies and the biggest one is on Othoni. Asphalt roads are available on many parts of the islands which are extended to settlements. There is complete electrification and a telephone network with Internet access.

== Sports ==
A.O Othoni, A.O Mathraki and A.O Ereikoussa were amateur football teams based on each island. During the 1970s and the 1980s the teams used to play against each other on fields in Chorio and Dafni settlement of Othoni. There was a football team called "F.C Ereikousa" created by Greek-Americans in the USA. In 2001, some Ereikoussians established in Corfu a football team called "Α.Ο ΕΡΕΙΚΟΥΣΑ" (A.S EREIKOUSA, former A.E ROPA) and they participated in Corfiot amateur football league. The team abolished some years later. In Othoni, there is one 6x6 football field and one basketball court next to Agia Triada church.

In August 2025, the Othoni Swimming Challenge was organized, the first open sea swimming race from the port of Ammos to the beach of Aspri Ammos and return (distance 5 km) as well as the Othoni tour of 18 km. with local and foreign swimmers.

== Media ==
A web page called diapontia.gr is a Diapontia-based site created in 2019 about news for Diapontia Islands.

== Notable Diapontians ==
- Maria Aronis (born 1957), Greek-American Cardiothoracic surgeon
- Linda Katehi (born 1954), Greek-American engineer, sixth chancellor of the University of California, Davis
- Dale Katechis, American, owner of the Oskar Blues Brewery in Colorado.
- Anastasios Katechis, assistant professor in University of Athens.
- John Katechis (born 1992), murderer in 2009 of George Weber
- Spyros Katechis (1919-unknown), Greek-Egyptian military commander and spy during World war II.
- Christos Katechis, key partner in telecommunications matters in NASA mission Apollo 11.
- Dr. Alexandros Mastoras (1936-2004) mayor of Corfu City.

== Diapontia in literature ==
- Ionion akron. Greece in the narrow of Otranto (Greek: Ιόνιον άκρων. Η Ελλάδα στοστενό του Ότραντο) (ISBN 960-7062-99-X)
- Folklore mission to Diapontian islands, by Dimitrios Loukatos, 2012 (Greek: Λαογραφική αποστολή στα Διαπόντια νησιά) (ISBN 960-404-246-7)
- Ereikoussa, the extra garden and the continental shelf of Diapontian islands by Greek journalist, Georgios Lekakis, 2014 (Greek: Ερείκουσσα, ο επιπλέον ανθόκηπος και η υφαλοκρηπίδα των Διαποντίων νήσων) (ISBN 978-960-454-102-7)
- The Fiddler's daughter (Greek: Στο καλύβι του Αριά) by Dimitra Kapelouzou, 2004

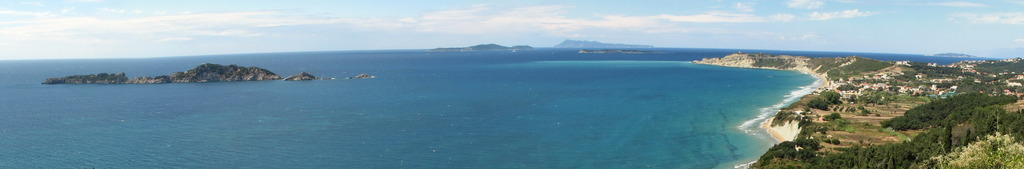
Panoramic view of Arillas and the Diapontian islands
