= Antipaxos =

Island in Greece

Αντίπαξος or Αντίπαξοι
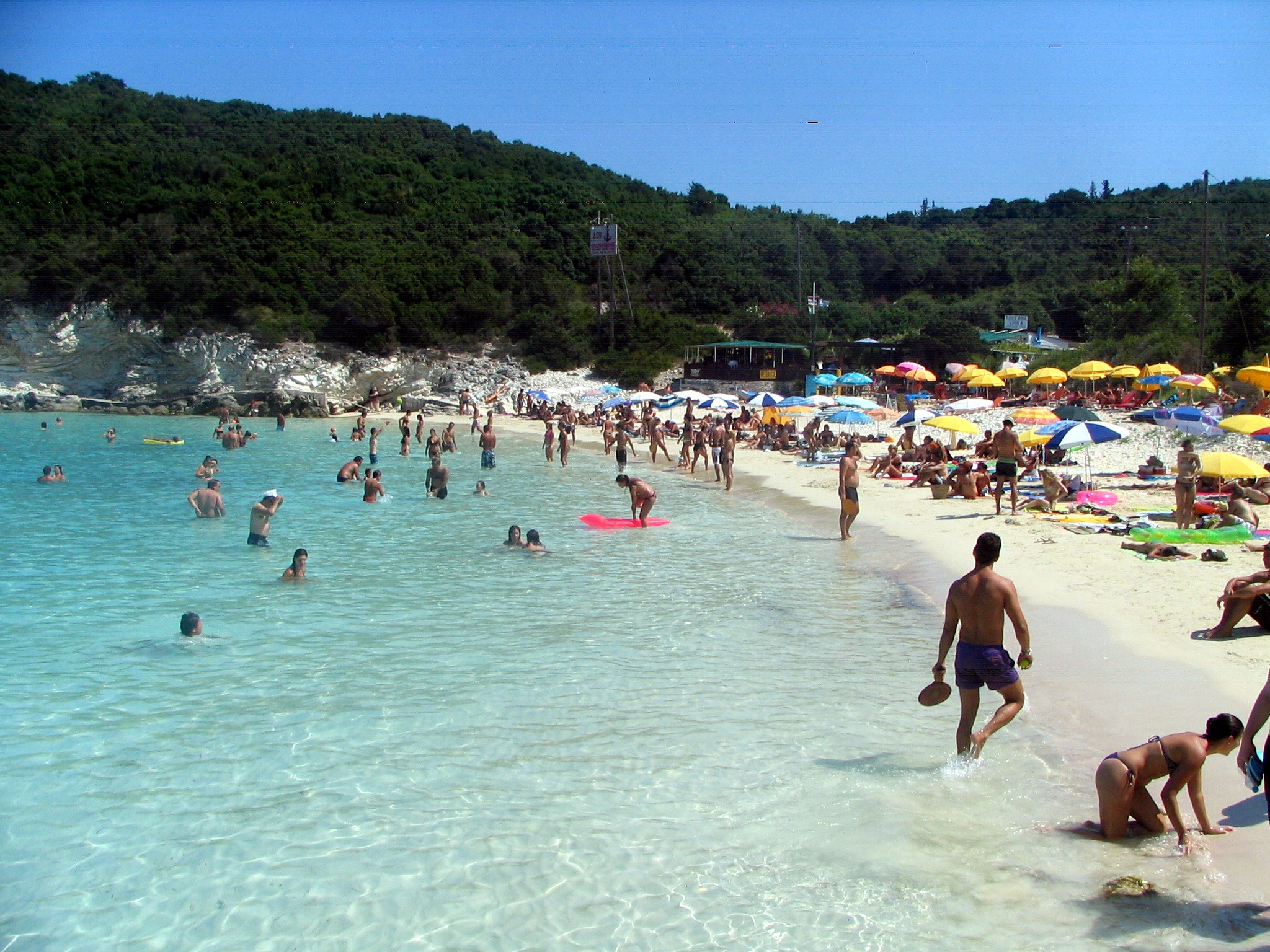
- Vrika beach at Antipaxos, Greece

- Location within Greece

Geography
- Coordinates: 39°08′57.40″N 20°13′53.98″E

Administration
- Greece

Demographics
- Population: 21 (2021)

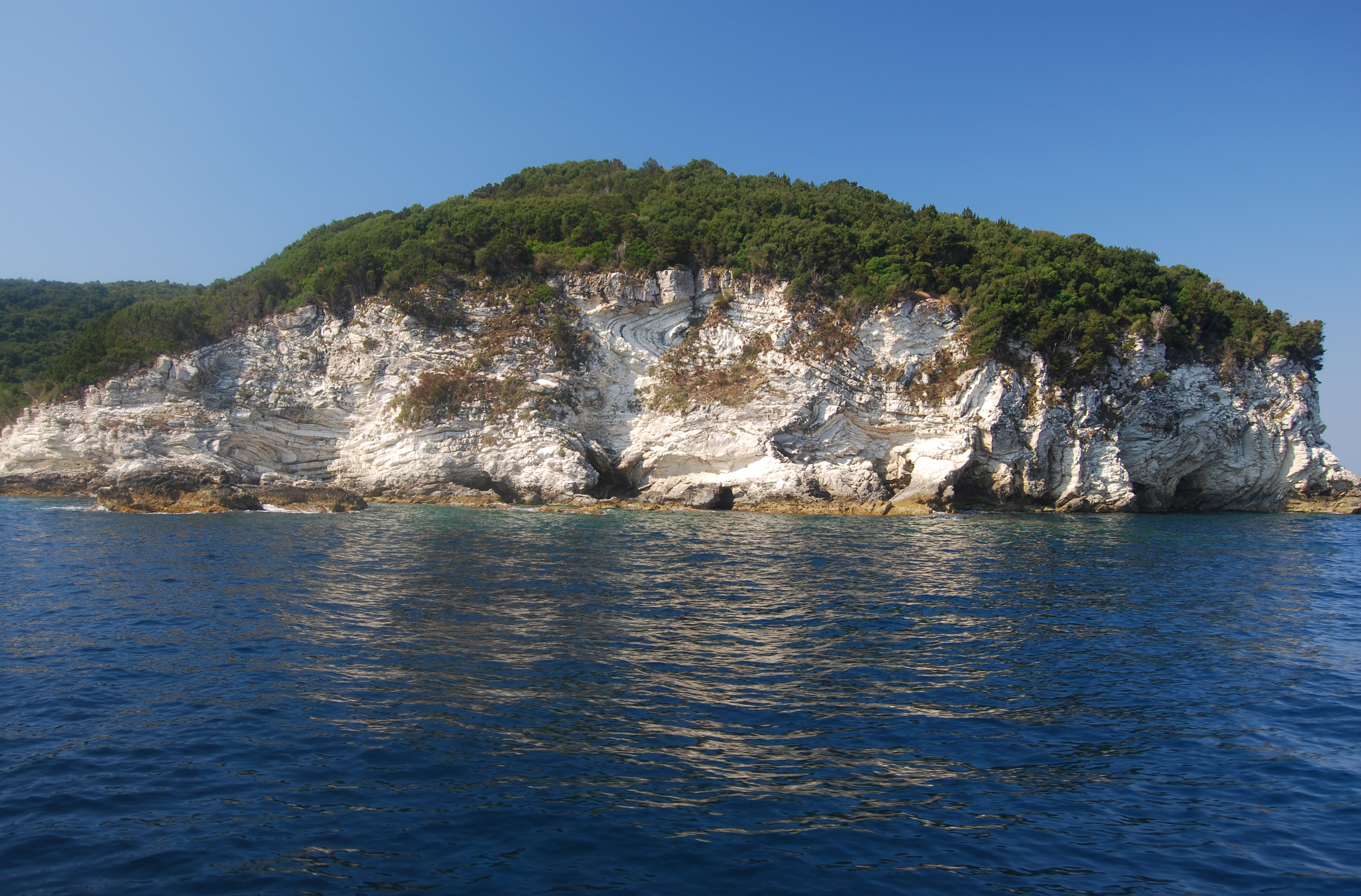
Cliffs on the island

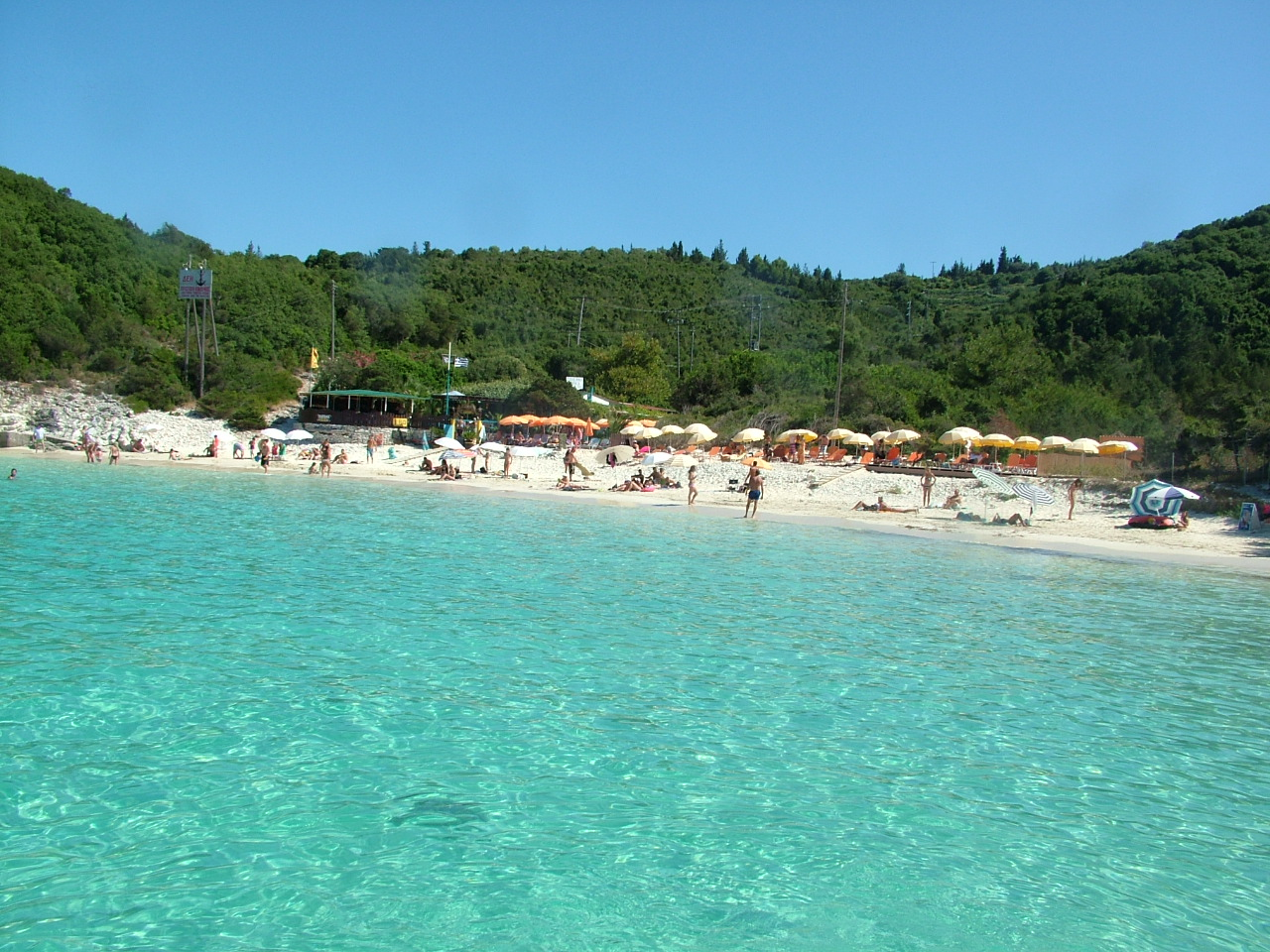
View of Vrika Beach

Antipaxos (Greek: Αντίπαξος, pronounced [ɐnˈdipɐksos]) is a small island (5 km^{2}) in Greece, about 3 kilometres (2 miles) to the south of Paxos. It is administratively part of the municipality of Paxoi in Corfu regional unit in western Greece. As of 2021, the resident population of the island was 21. Largely covered in vineyards, Antipaxos has several beaches and one harbour, Agrapidia.

It has three main beaches: Vrika (white sand), Mesovrika (pebbles) and Voutoumi (pebbles) and it can be reached by 15-minute ride with a sea-taxi from the port of Gaios in Paxos.

== Depiction in culture ==
In fiction, it is the birthplace of Nadja of Antipaxos played by Natasia Demetriou in What We Do in the Shadows.
