= Lakka, Greece =

Village on Paxi

Lakka Λάκκα
- Community
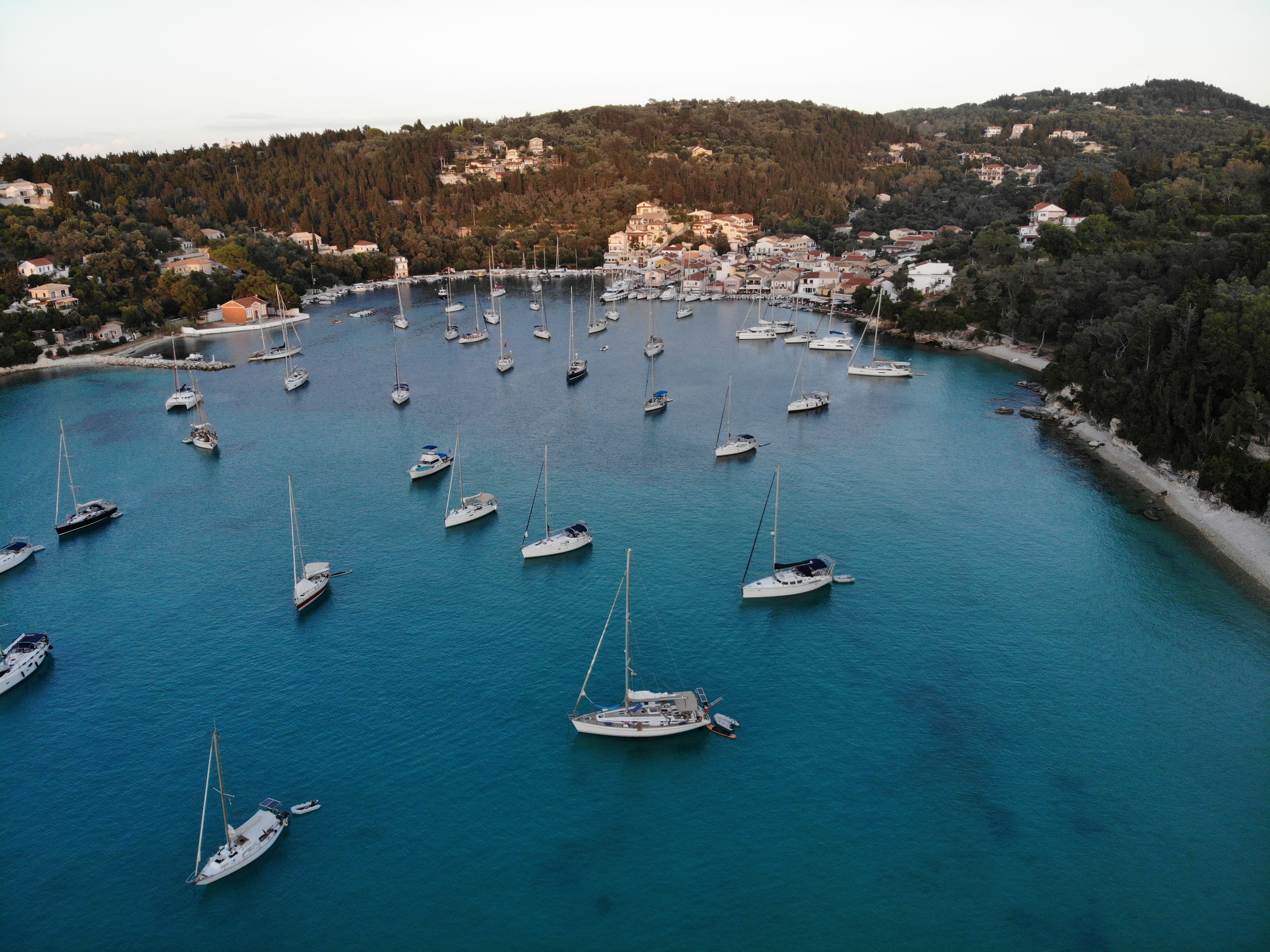
- Lakka

- Location within Greece
- Coordinates: 39°14′04″N 20°08′10″E
- Country: Greece
- Administrative region: Ionian Islands
- Regional unit: Corfu
- Municipality: Paxos

Population (2021)
  - Community: 487
- Time zone: UTC+2 (EET)
  - Summer (DST): UTC+3 (EEST)

Lakka (Greek: Λάκκα, pronounced [ˈlaka]) is a village situated on Paxi, a Greek Island in the Ionian Sea approximately 17 kilometres (9 nautical miles) south of Corfu.

== Geography ==
Lakka is the second largest village in size on the northern end of Paxos and is flanked by silver green olive groves and cypress trees. The picturesque fishing village is located on a natural, almost circular harbor created by two headlands sheltering the bay from the open sea.

== Tourism ==
Lakka is a popular tourist destination for yachting, windsurfing, snorkeling and swimming. The two main beaches within the Lakka bay, white pebbled Kanoni and sandy Harami lead to a very clear turquoise sea. Other nearby beaches (such as Monadendri, Orkos, Arkoudaki and Glyfada) can be found on the east coast of the island, just outside the Lakka bay, but in most cases can only be reached on foot or by boat (the exception being the crowded Monadendri beach which can also be accessed by car).
