= Dimitrios Loukatos =

Greek folklorist (1908–2003)

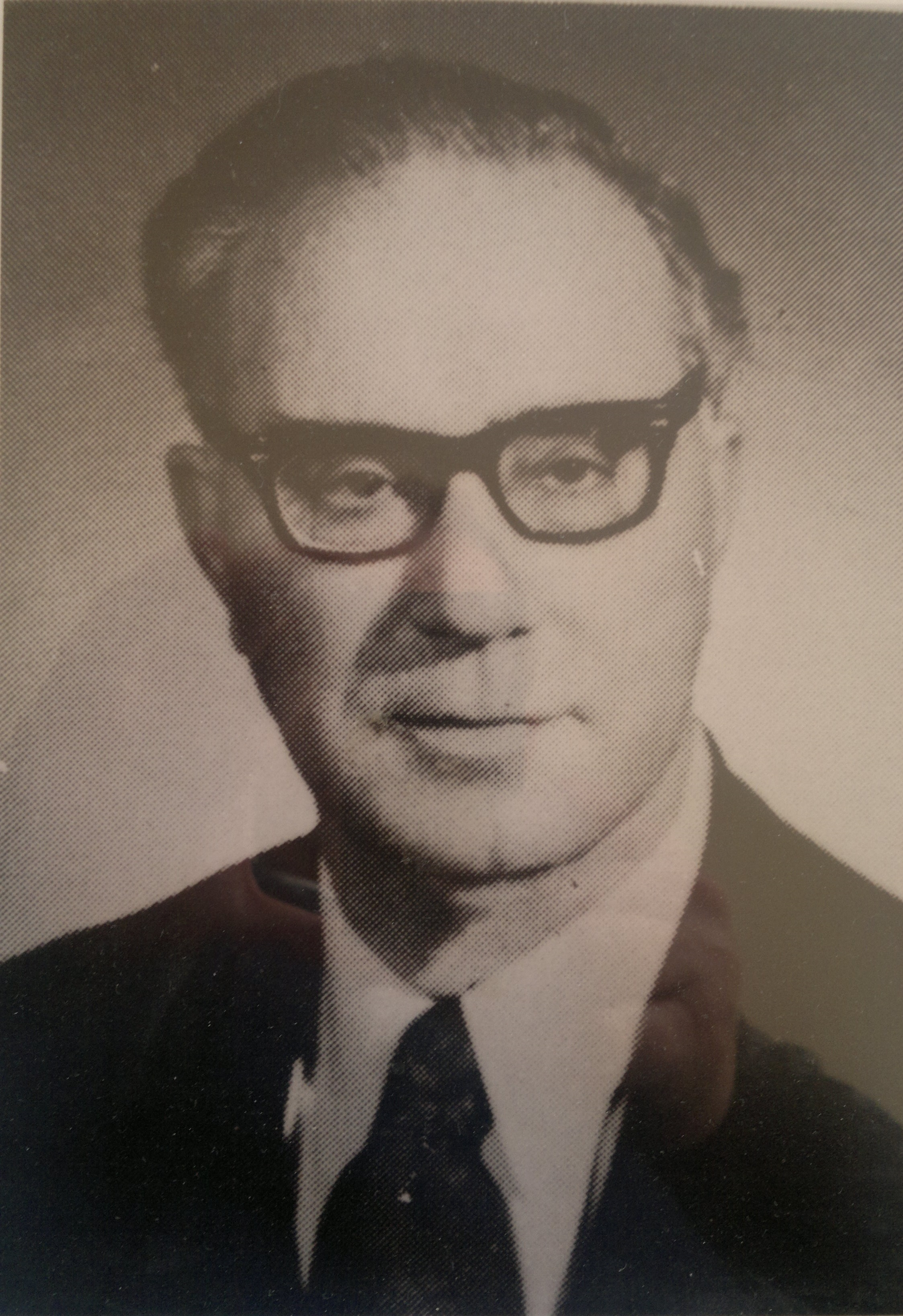
Photo Demetrios Loukatos

Dimitrios "Dimitris" Loukatos (1908–2003), was a folklorist-anthropologist and specialist in Greek folklore.

== Life and academic career ==
He was born in Argostoli, Cephalonia, in 1908. He excelled as a pupil and, like the minority of his generation who received schooling, he was taught through the medium of katharevousa—an archaic "pure" form of the Greek language. Outside school he was also attentive to the language and customs of his fellow islanders and became a master of Kephallonitika (Cephalonian dialect), an expertise that is evident in several of his earliest works about Cephalonian traditions.

He studied philology and educational studies at the University of Athens in 1925–1930. After graduation he was employed as a high-school teacher in Cephalonia, Athens, and subsequently in Kilkis. In 1938, he was commissioned by the renowned folklorist Georgios A. Megas to work as Editor for the Archives of Folklore at the Academy of Athens (now Centre for Greek Folklore Research). His work there was interrupted during World War II when, in 1940, he was sent to Albania to be part of the Greek army that repulsed Mussolini's troops. Loukatos' swan song was the publication of the diary notes he made during this campaign.

After fighting for his fellow countrymen in the war, Dimitris Loukatos did not want to fight against them in the Greek Civil War that ensued. In 1947 he went to the Sorbonne, Paris, where he was awarded a doctorate in 1950. On his return to Greece he resumed his work as Editor at the Archives of Folklore. He married Zoe Bibikou and had a son, Sotiris. In his capacity as editor at the Archives of Folklore, he took an active part in many folklore projects, including research on his own native island of Cephalonia just after the devastating earthquake of 1953. In 1964 he was one of the three professors that started from scratch the newly created School of Philosophy at the university of Ioannina, a post he retained until 1969, when, finding it was not any more possible to cope with the rules imposed by the military dictatorship (1967–1974) in education, he resigned. He subsequently held chairs in the Universities of Crete (1979–1981) and Patras (1984–1985).

== Writing and research ==
In addition to his academic career, Dimitris Loukatos is to be remembered most for his prolific writing. He published more than 450 academic works—mainly articles—references to which are to be found in practically every major publication connected with Greek folklore or Greek anthropology. Among his most celebrated works is Kephallonitiki Latria, which is a scholarly record of the distinct folk religion and unique Orthodox rituals celebrated on the author's native island. His rich accompanying glossary of Orthodox terms includes several entries not found in Ilias Tsitsels's standard dictionary of Cephalonian dialect. Kephallonitiki Latria was translated into French by Jean Malbert as "Religion Populaire a Céphalonie", and published by the Institut Français in Athens in 1950, but without the author's glossary.

Dimitris Loukatos's fascination for Cephalonian folklore also led to the publication of Kephallonitika Gnomika, which is a rich collection of Cephalonian folk sayings and maxims, and also of proverbs that are arranged thematically and accompanied by a detailed index. This was followed by Neoellenika Laographika Kimena, Synchrona Laographika, Neoelleniki Parimiomythi, and the monumental work Isagoyi stin Elleniki Laographia. This is regarded as one of the classics of Greek folklore in which Dimitris Loukatos presented theories that influenced subsequent folklore research.

He is perhaps best known in Greece for his best-selling five-volume work on Greek calendar customs, which has had both scholarly and popular appeal. The first title in the series, "Customs of Christmas and the Festive Holidays", appeared in 1979. Some of the material in this book, such as the chapter on the Vasilopita ("St Basil's Pie") had already appeared as articles in various journals. The next title in the series was "Easter and Spring Customs" published in 1980, followed by "Summer Customs" in 1981, "Autumn Customs" in 1982 and, finally, by "Supplementary Customs of Winter and Spring" in 1985. Each of these volumes has been reprinted several times, and in 1992 the publishers commissioned Greek folklorist Georgios N. Aikaterinidis to compile the indispensable “Evretirio” (Index) to the five volumes.

He was also a versatile author. In addition to his academic folklore works, he also published linguistic and ethnomusicological studies, as well as reviews and even witty cultural prose. For instance, in "The Wedding of Mr Memos", we see a rare glimpse of his inimitable humour combined with an ethnographical description of his own Cephalonians.

In 1993 he collaborated as a special scientific advisor in the compilation of the Encyclopaedian Dictionary of Byzantine Music (Editor: Olympia Tolika) of the European Art Center (EUARCE) of Greece and in 1995 he was the Member of International Honorary Committee of the Worldwide Dictionary of Music (Editor: Olympia Tolika) of EUARCE

In and beside his works he was one of the progressive intellectuals defending the replacement in education and official documents of the Katharevousa (archaic pure form of the Greek language, defended by conservative parts of society) by the Dimotiki (ordinary language with realistic grammatical rules). He also wrote an article "Tourist Archeofolklore in Greece" about how Greece makes the most of its past for tourism.

Dimitris Loukatos also contributed detailed entries to major reference works such as the majority of the folklore entries for the twelve-volume Encyclopaedia of Religion and Ethics. Moreover, in his capacity as President of the Greek Folklore Society, a position he had held since 1978, he was also Editor of the Society's scholarly journal Laographia.

== Awards and recognition ==
He enjoyed international recognition for his contribution to folklore studies. In 1981 he was awarded the Gottfried Von Herder prize by the university and Academy of Vienna. The Greek State conferred on him the honour of the “Taxiarhis tou Phinikos” (Archangel of the Phoenix), and in 1985 the Ohio State University published in his honour a Festschrift entitled in the journal "Proverbium". In 1989 he was made an honorary member of the International Society for Folk Narrative Research and he was a corresponding member of the Academy of Sciences in Palermo. He was also awarded honorary positions in several other societies in which he played an active part. Due to the influence of Italian culture on the Ionian Islands and to his French education he used French and Italian in his work and made efforts to maintain French as an official language in the international conferences he organized or took part in.

== Late life and legacy ==
Throughout his long and distinguished career, Loukatos devoted a great deal of time to younger folklorists, encouraging and advising them. Even though he spent most of his life outside Cephalonia, he knew the local culture intimately and he never forgot his own simple roots. He ensured that the Korialenios Library in Argostoli, Cephalonia, was supplied with an extremely rich collection of folklore material. Dimitris Loukatos died at the age of 96. He had long been a widower and is survived by his son, physicist Sotiris Loucatos.

== Relevant literature ==
- Doulaveras, Aristeides N. “Démétrios S. Loukatos as a Paremiologist”. Conversing with Greek Folk Culture. Various Essays, edited by Aristeides N. Doulaveras, Thessaloniki: Stamouli Publications, 2021, pp. 43–49. (in Greek)
