= Longos, Paxoi =

Longos Λογγός
- Community
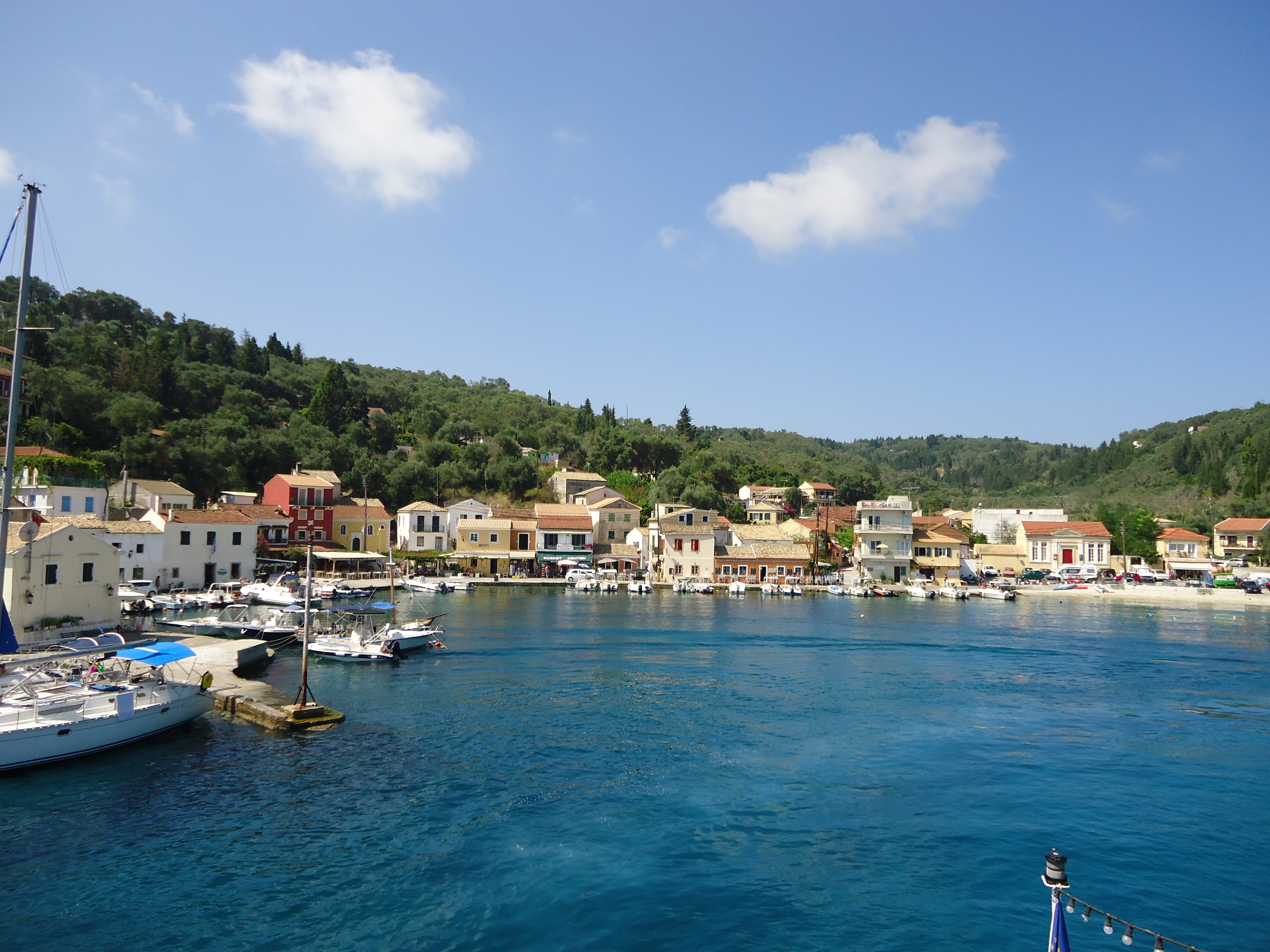
- Longos

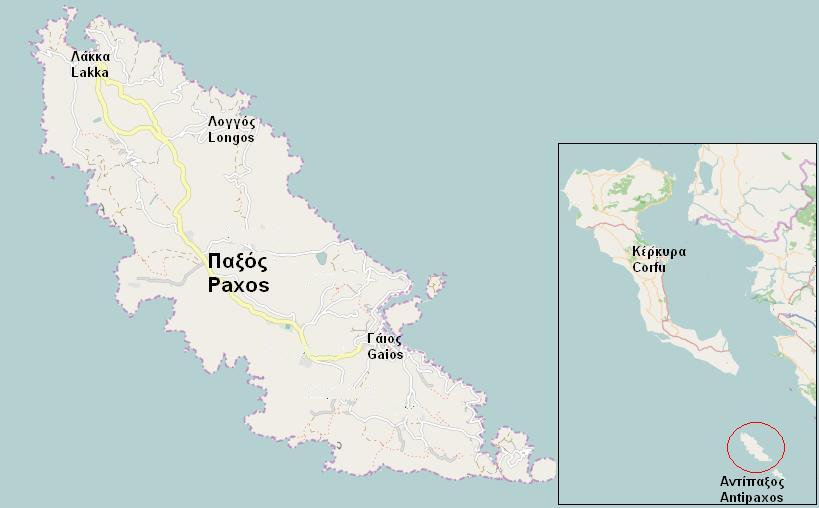

- Location within Greece
- Coordinates: 39°13.5′N 20°9.6′E
- Country: Greece
- Administrative region: Ionian Islands
- Regional unit: Corfu
- Municipality: Paxoi

Population (2021)
  - Community: 267
- Time zone: UTC+2 (EET)
  - Summer (DST): UTC+3 (EEST)

Longos (Greek: Λογγός) is the smallest of the island ports on Paxoi, one of the Ionian Islands of Greece. The community of Longos includes the villages Longos, Anemogiannatika, Dendiatika, Kagkatika, Kontogiannatika and Koutsi.

== Population ==
Year	Settlement population	Population community
1981	-	275
1991	62	-
2001	71	280
2011	81	298
2021	74	267

== Geography ==
Longos is situated on the northeast coast of the island, and has a small fishing harbour. There are several shops and bars. At one end of Longos harbour stands the tall chimney from an abandoned soap factory. There are several shingle beaches nearby.

== See also ==
- List of settlements in the Corfu regional unit
