= Mathraki =

Greek island in the Ionian Sea

Mathraki Μαθράκι
- Municipal unit
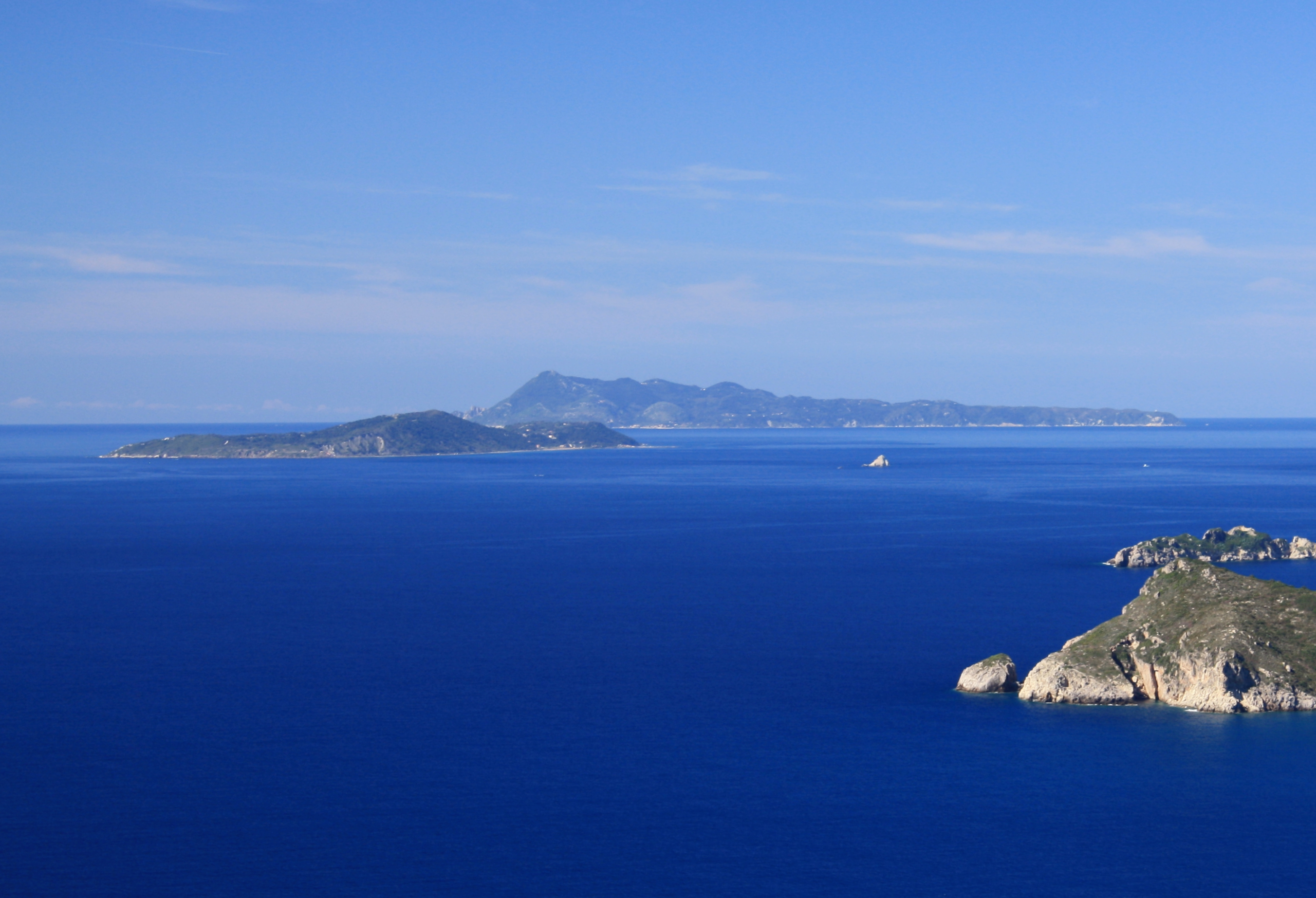
- The Diapontian islands, with Mathraki on the left

- Location within the regional unit

- Location within Greece
- Coordinates: 39°46′N 19°31′E
- Country: Greece
- Administrative region: Ionian Islands
- Regional unit: Corfu
- Municipality: Central Corfu and Diapontian Islands

Area
  - Municipal unit: 3.532 km^{2} (1.364 sq mi)
- Highest elevation: 152 m (499 ft)

Population (2021)
  - Municipal unit: 174
  - Municipal unit density: 49.3/km^{2} (128/sq mi)
- Time zone: UTC+2 (EET)
  - Summer (DST): UTC+3 (EEST)
- Postal code: 491 00
- Area code: 26630
- Vehicle registration: ΚΥ
- Website: diapontia.gr

Mathraki (Greek: Μαθράκι, Ancient Greek: Μαθράκιον) is an island and a former community of the Ionian Islands, Greece. It is one of the Diapontian Islands. Since the 2019 local government reform, it is part of the municipality of Central Corfu and Diapontian Islands, of which it is a municipal unit. The municipal unit has an area of 3.532 km^{2}. Mathraki is a 45-minute boat ride off the coast of Corfu (4 NM from Cape Arilas). It has three restaurants that double as general stores, villas and "rooms to let". Mathraki is a quiet island that manages to stay clear of tourists except for the occasional hikers that brave the rocky coastline. The municipal unit includes the three nearby islets Diakopo, Diaplo and Tracheia.

== History ==
Mathraki has been inhabited since the 16th century by settlers from the nearby islands of Paxoi and Othonoi. The origin of its name is unknown, but according to a popular tradition, it derives from anthrakia, because in the past the island had been burnt. It became part of Greece in 1864, when the Ionian islands were ceded to Greece by the British. Today it is a serene and tranquil place for holidays. In 2021, the only elementary school of the island re-opened after 21 years with only one student.

== Historical population ==
Year	Population
2001	297
2011	329
2021	174
