= Gaios =

Main port on Paxos, Greece

Gaios Γάιος
- Community
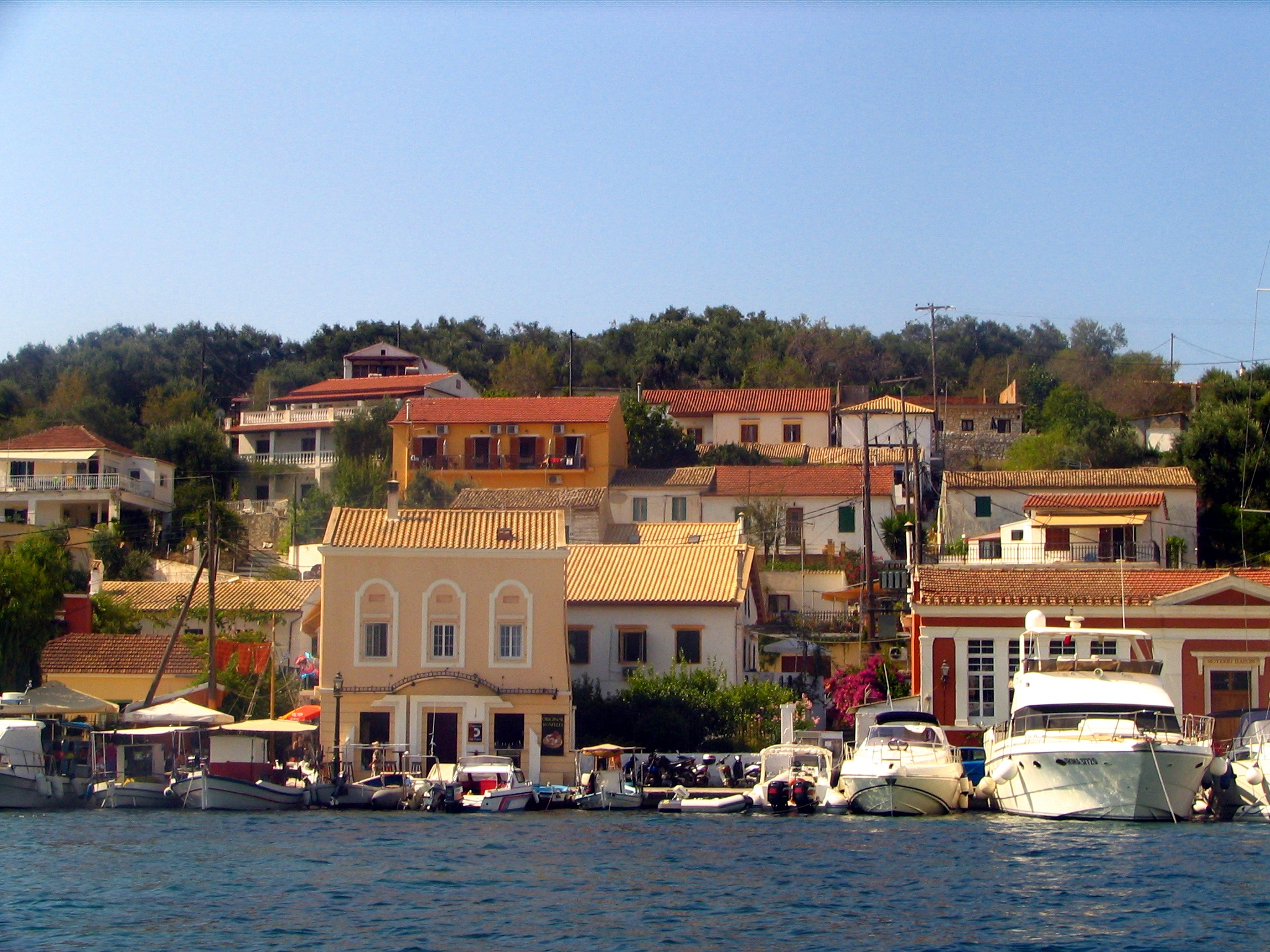
- Rows of houses in Gaios, as seen from the strait

- Location within Greece
- Coordinates: 39°12′N 20°11′E
- Country: Greece
- Administrative region: Ionian Islands
- Regional unit: Corfu
- Municipality: Paxos

Population (2021)
  - Community: 1,396
- Time zone: UTC+2 (EET)
  - Summer (DST): UTC+3 (EEST)

Gaios (Greek: Γάιος, pronounced [ˈɣaʝos]) is the main port on Paxos, the smallest of the seven principal Ionian Islands, in Greece. Gaios is situated on the east coast of the island. It is named after a homonymous pupil of Paul the Apostle, who brought Christianity to the island.

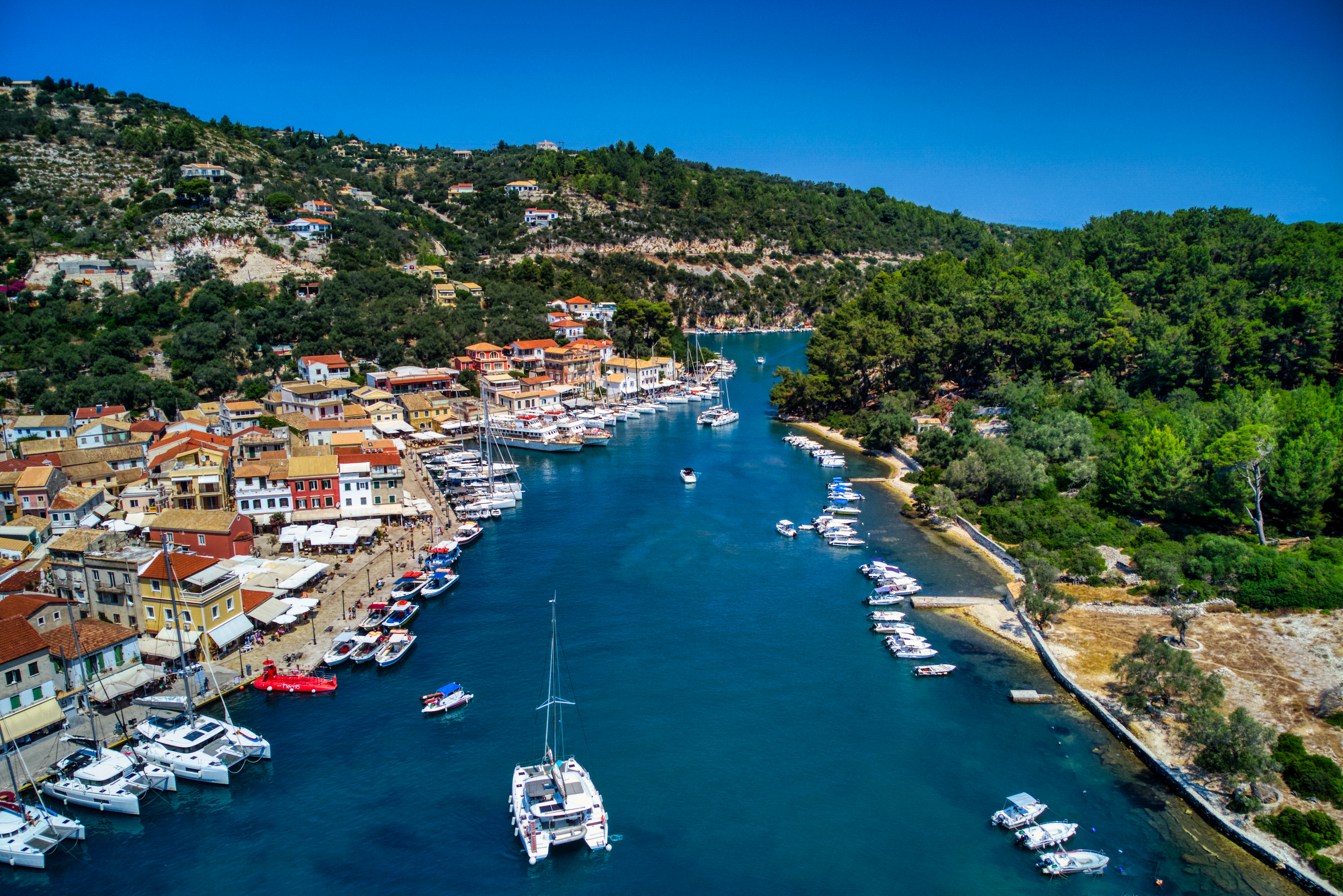
Gaios Port

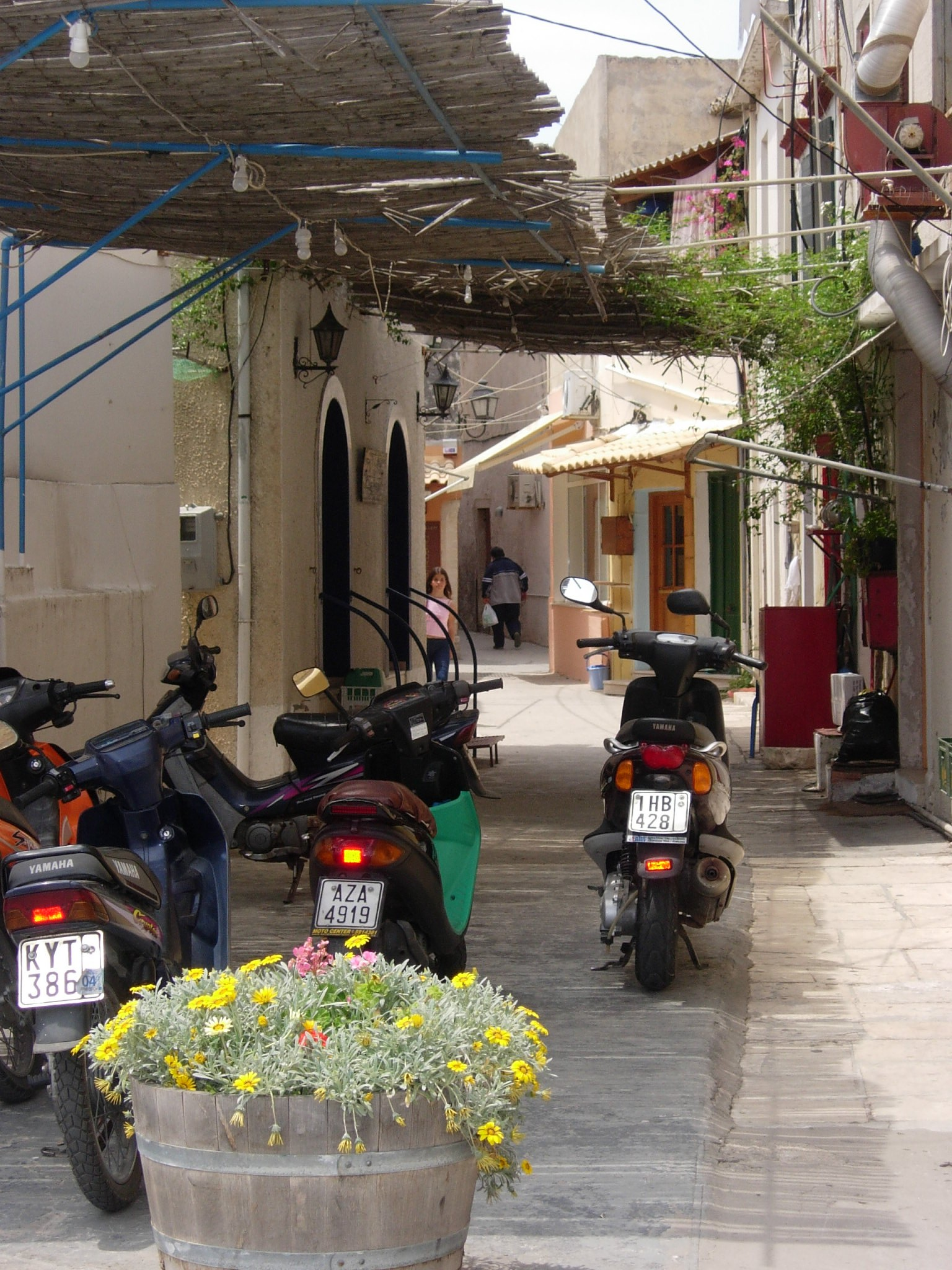
Street of Gaios

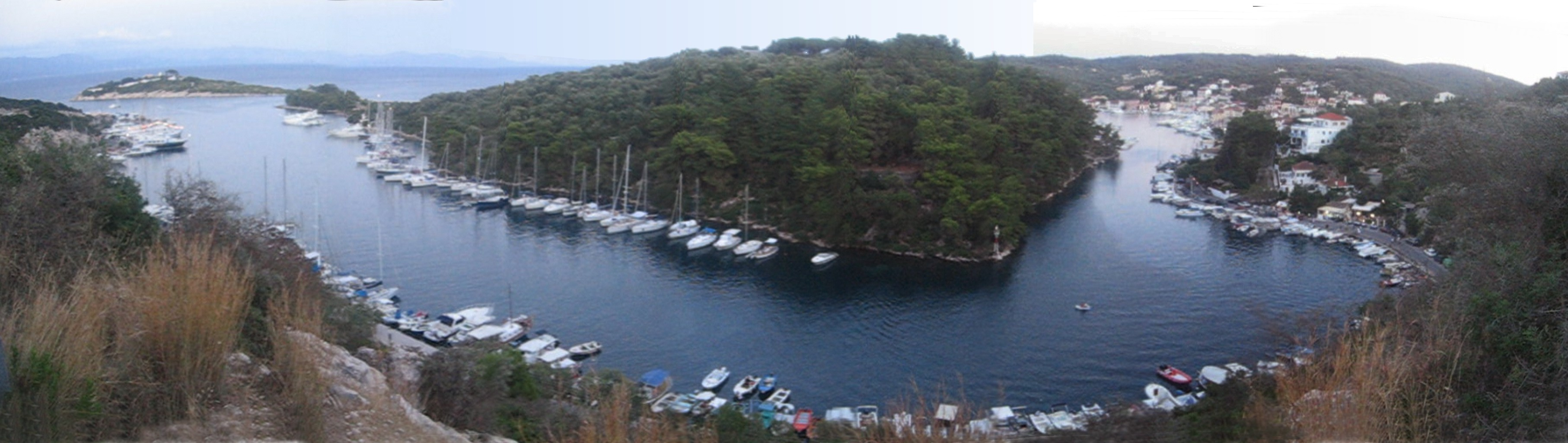
Panoramic view of the strait surrounding St Nicolas islet (center): the islet and monastery of Panagia to the north (left), port and main settlement of Gaios to the center and south (right).
