= Paxos =

Greek island in the Ionian Sea

Paxoi Παξοί
- Municipality
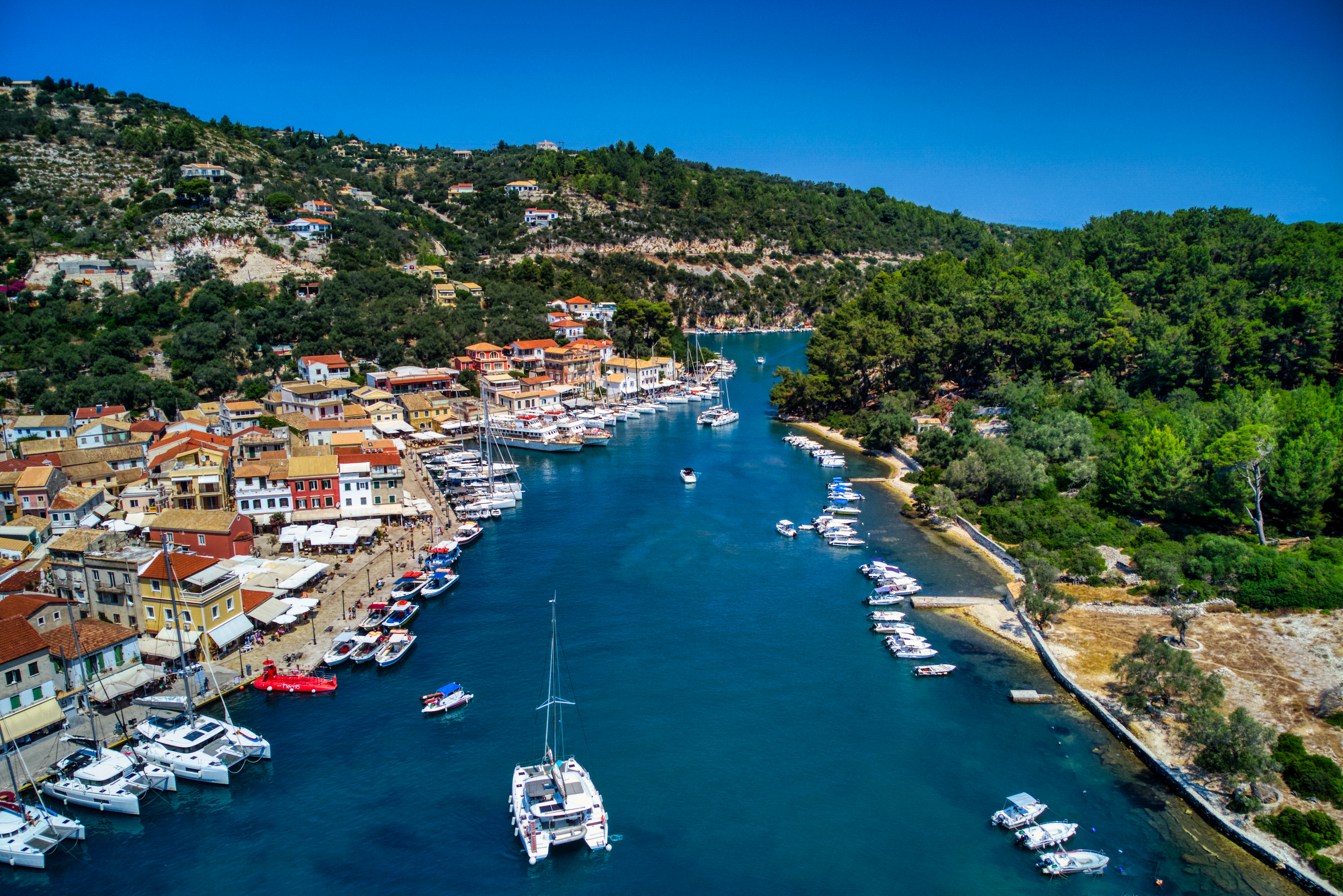
- Port of Gaios, the main town of the island

- Flag

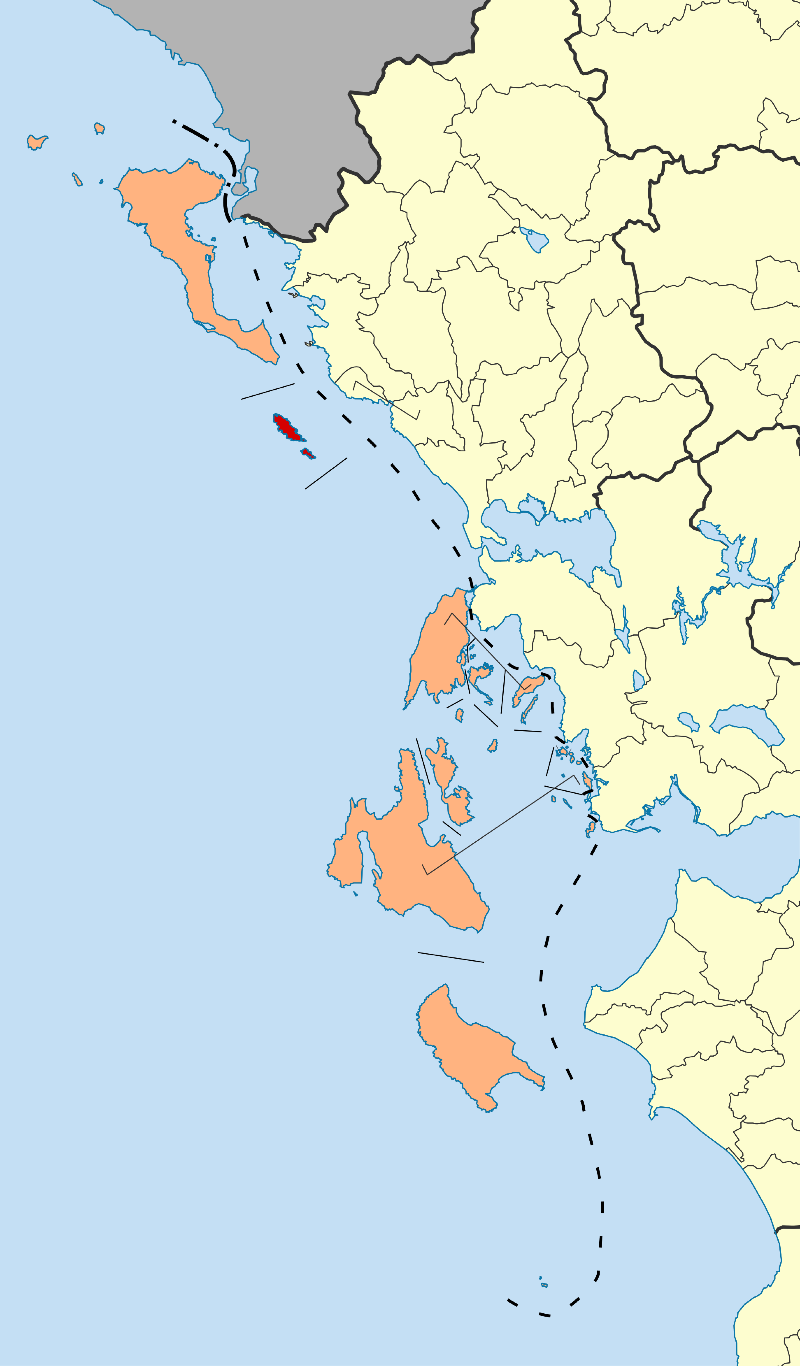

- Location within Greece
- Coordinates: 39°12′N 20°10′E
- Country: Greece
- Administrative region: Ionian Islands
- Regional unit: Corfu
- Seat: Gaios

Area
  - Municipality: 30.121 km^{2} (11.630 sq mi)

Population (2021)
  - Municipality: 2,466
  - Density: 81.87/km^{2} (212.0/sq mi)
- Time zone: UTC+2 (EET)
  - Summer (DST): UTC+3 (EEST)
- Postal code: 490 82
- Area code: 26620
- Vehicle registration: KY
- Website: www.paxi.gr

Paxos (Greek: Παξός) is a Greek island in the Ionian Sea, lying just south of Corfu. As a group with the nearby island of Antipaxos and adjoining islets, it is also called by the plural form Paxi or Paxoi (Greek: Παξοί, pronounced /pækˈsiː/ in English and [paˈksi] in Greek). The main town and the seat of the municipality is Gaios. The smallest of the seven main Ionian Islands (the Heptanese), Paxos has an area of 25.3 square kilometres (9.8 sq mi), while the municipality has an area of 30.121 km^{2} (11.630 sq mi) and a population of 2,466.

Paxos lies some 15 km from the southern tip of Corfu and at about the same distance from the town of Parga on the mainland. It is connected by ferry lines from Igoumenitsa and Corfu with Gaios. The island is hilly, the highest point having an elevation of 230 m.

In Greek mythology, Poseidon created the island by striking Corfu with his trident, so that he and his wife Amphitrite could have some peace and quiet.

== History ==
Paxos is a historical island that has been inhabited since prehistoric times. According to tradition, the Phoenicians were the first settlers on Paxos, and it is believed that the name "Paxos" originated from the Phoenician word "Pax," meaning "trapezoidal." In ancient times, Paxos played a significant role, especially during the First Illyrian War in 229 BC when the Battle of Paxos was fought between the ancient Greek and Illyrian fleets. The account of this battle is documented in The Histories, a work by the ancient historian Polybius.

Paxos has been ruled by various conquerors, including the Romans in the 2nd century BC, pirates during the Byzantine era and Middle Ages, and by Crusaders. Eventually, the Venetians gained control of the island at the end of the 14th century.

During the Napoleonic Wars, the Ionian Islands were occupied by the French and the Russo-Turkish alliance. However, Paxos surrendered to the Royal Navy frigate HMS Apollo and 160 troops from the 2nd Greek Light Infantry from Cephalonia and the 35th Regiment of the Royal Corsican Rangers on February 13, 1814. The United Kingdom established the United States of the Ionian Islands in 1815. In 1864 Paxos, along with the rest of the Ionian Islands, were ceded to Greece following the coronation of George I of Greece.

== Geography ==
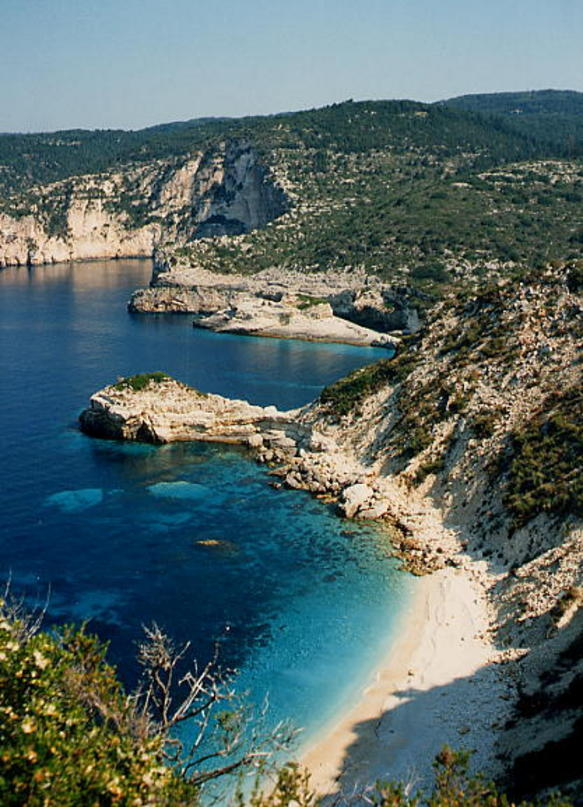
West coast

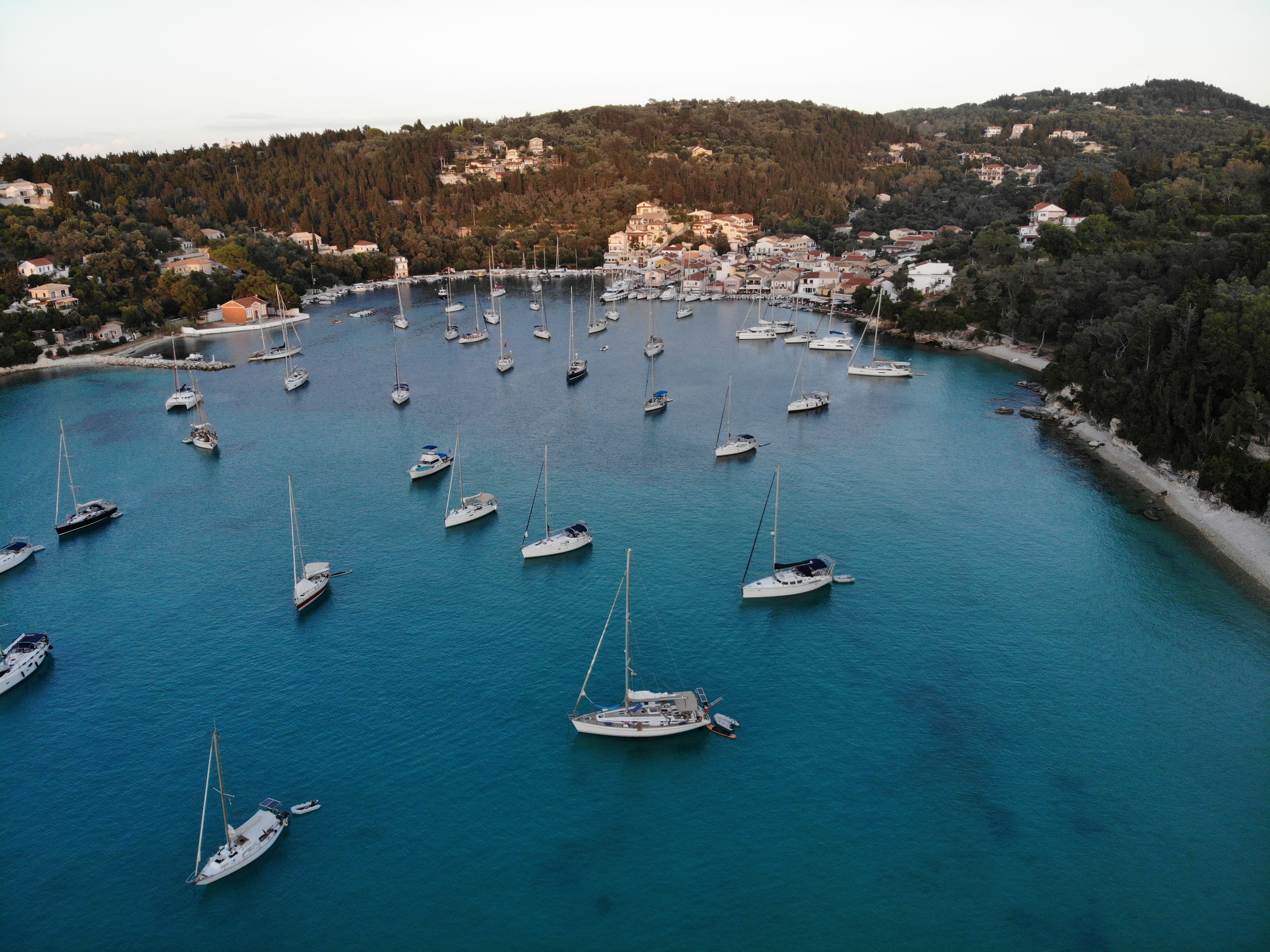
Lakka bay

Paxos lies some 15 km from the southern tip of Corfu, and at about the same distance from the town of Parga on the mainland.

The island is approximately 10 kilometres (6 mi) long and up to 3 kilometres (2 mi) wide, stretching in northwest–southeast direction. Much of the hilly landscape is covered in olive groves. These stretch from Lakka, the harbour community in the north, through Magazia to Gaios, the capital. Coastal communities of Gaios, Lakka and Longos on the east coast are the three main settlements, while the interior features numerous scattered hamlets. The west coast is dominated by steep white, chalky cliffs that are greatly eroded at sea level, and harbour many "blue caves". The highest point of the island is Agios Isavros at an elevation of 231 m. Several islets lie very close to the coast of Paxos: Agios Nikolaos and Panagia protect the harbor of Gaios, while Mongonisi and Kaltsonisi lie off the southeastern tip. Antipaxos lies some 5 km further southeast.

The production of olive oil, soap manufacture and fishing were supplanted by tourism as the main industry in the mid-1960s, resulting in a construction boom, which has greatly altered the coastline around Gaios, the capital of the Paxiot demos (community).

== Fauna ==
=== Reptiles and amphibians ===
Only a few articles have been published on the herpetofauna of Paxos and Antipaxos; the latest in 2014 and 2017, where the following reptile species were confirmed: Hemidactylus turcicus, Mediodactylus kotschyi, Algyroides nigropunctatus, Hierophis gemonensis, and Zamenis longissimus. Earlier reports of Lacerta viridis, Laudakia stellio, and Platyceps najadum were not confirmed.

No amphibians have been reported on the islands.

== Province ==
The province of Paxoi (Greek: Επαρχία Παξών) was one of the provinces of the Corfu Prefecture. Its territory corresponded with that of the current municipality Paxoi. It was abolished in 2006.

== Foreign residents ==
Among well known semi-permanent British inhabitants were Audrey Good, former commander of the UN refugee bases in Epirus following the Greek Civil War, actor Peter Bull (author of It Isn't All Greek to Me), and actress Susannah York.

Members of the Agnelli family (of FIAT fame) have built a palatial holiday home—complete with faux medieval tower—on a small island of (Kaltonisi) situated near the southernmost tip ('the heel') of Paxos, close to the beach of Mongonissi.

Former Norwegian diplomats and chief architects of the Oslo Accords, Terje Rød-Larsen and his wife Mona Juul, have built a sprawling holiday home on the island.

Paxos is part of a European network called Cultural Village of Europe. The annual Paxos Festival was founded by John Gough, and is now organised by the Guildhall School of Music and Drama in London, and attracts some of Europe's finest young performers. This festival events usually take place between June and September and are usually held in the disused school of Longos.

== Transport ==
The island is serviced by combined passenger and vehicle ferries which operate year-round from the port of Igoumenitsa on the mainland of Greece (1.5 hours). In the tourist season hydrofoils, passenger ferries and sea-taxis operate from Corfu (1–2 hours). A hydrofoil passenger service operates outside the tourist season, but is infrequent and weather dependent. Winter visitors should anticipate occasional periods of isolation.

== Climate ==
Climate data for Loggos, Paxi (Λογγός, Παξοί)
Month	Jan	Feb	Mar	Apr	May	Jun	Jul	Aug	Sep	Oct	Nov	Dec	Year
Mean daily maximum °C (°F)	13.9 (57.0)	14.3 (57.7)	16.0 (60.8)	19.0 (66.2)	23.9 (75.0)	28.2 (82.8)	31.1 (88.0)	31.4 (88.5)	27.6 (81.7)	23.2 (73.8)	18.5 (65.3)	15.2 (59.4)	21.9 (71.4)
Mean daily minimum °C (°F)	5.2 (41.4)	5.8 (42.4)	6.8 (44.2)	9.5 (49.1)	13.4 (56.1)	16.9 (62.4)	18.8 (65.8)	19.3 (66.7)	16.8 (62.2)	13.8 (56.8)	9.8 (49.6)	6.7 (44.1)	11.9 (53.4)
Average precipitation mm (inches)	132 (5.2)	136 (5.4)	98 (3.9)	62 (2.4)	36 (1.4)	14 (0.6)	7 (0.3)	18 (0.7)	75 (3.0)	148 (5.8)	181 (7.1)	180 (7.1)	1,087 (42.9)
Source: Norwegian Meteorological Institute (temperatures) and Holiday Weather.com (rainfall)

== Communities and settlements ==
- Antipaxos (nearby island)
- Mogonisi (nearby island)
- Panagia (nearby island)
- Agios Nikolaos (nearby island)
- Katsonisi (nearby island)
- Apergatika
- Argyratika
- Arvanitakeika
- Aronatika
- Dalietatika
- Gaios (seat)
- Gramatikeika
- Lakka (second-largest settlement)
- Loggos (third-largest settlement)
- Magazia
- Makratika
- Ozias
- Platanos (or Fontana / Fountana)
- Velianitatika (or Veliantatika)
- Vlachopoulatika
- Zenebissatika
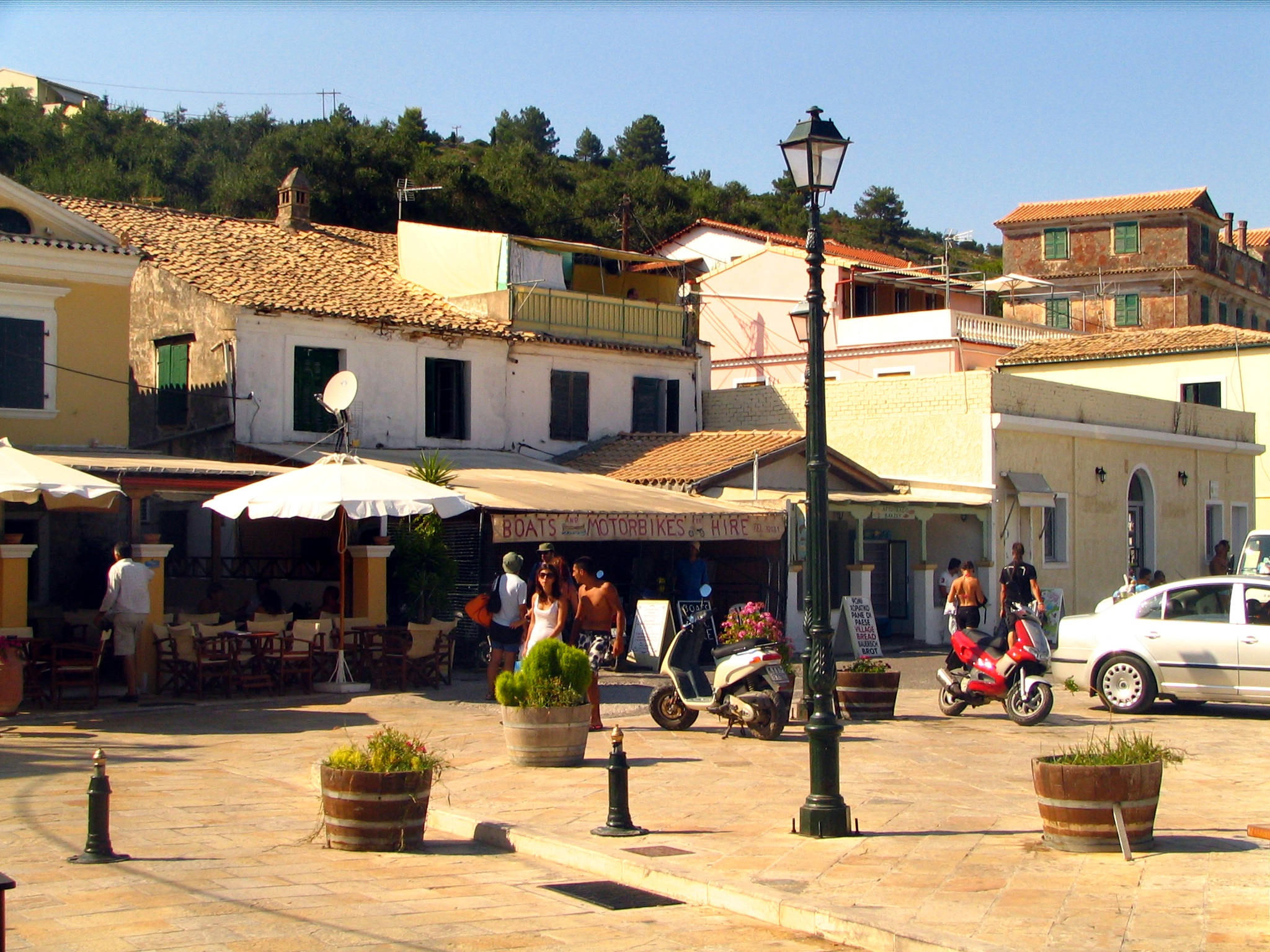
Square of Gaios

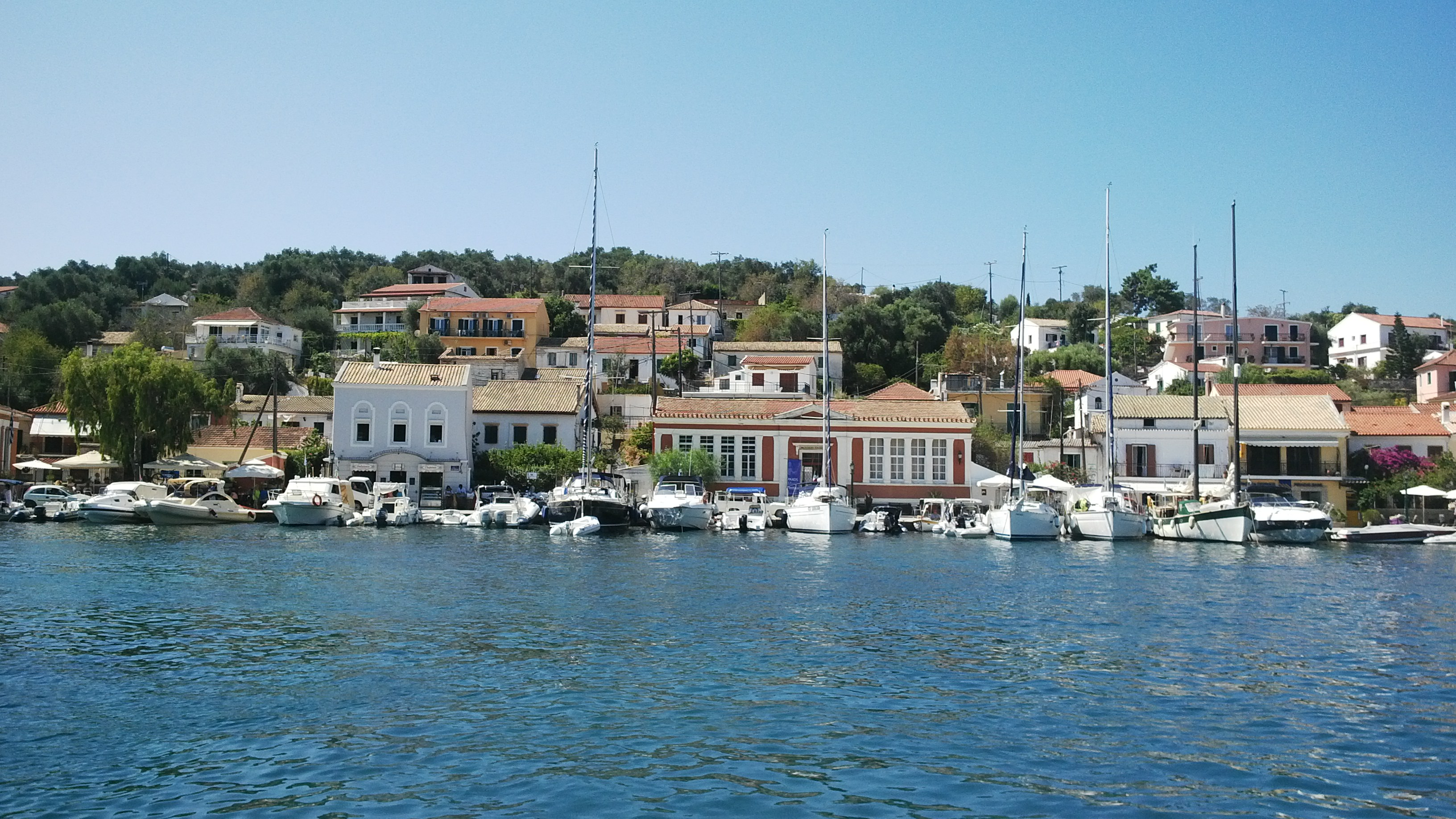
Museum of Paxos

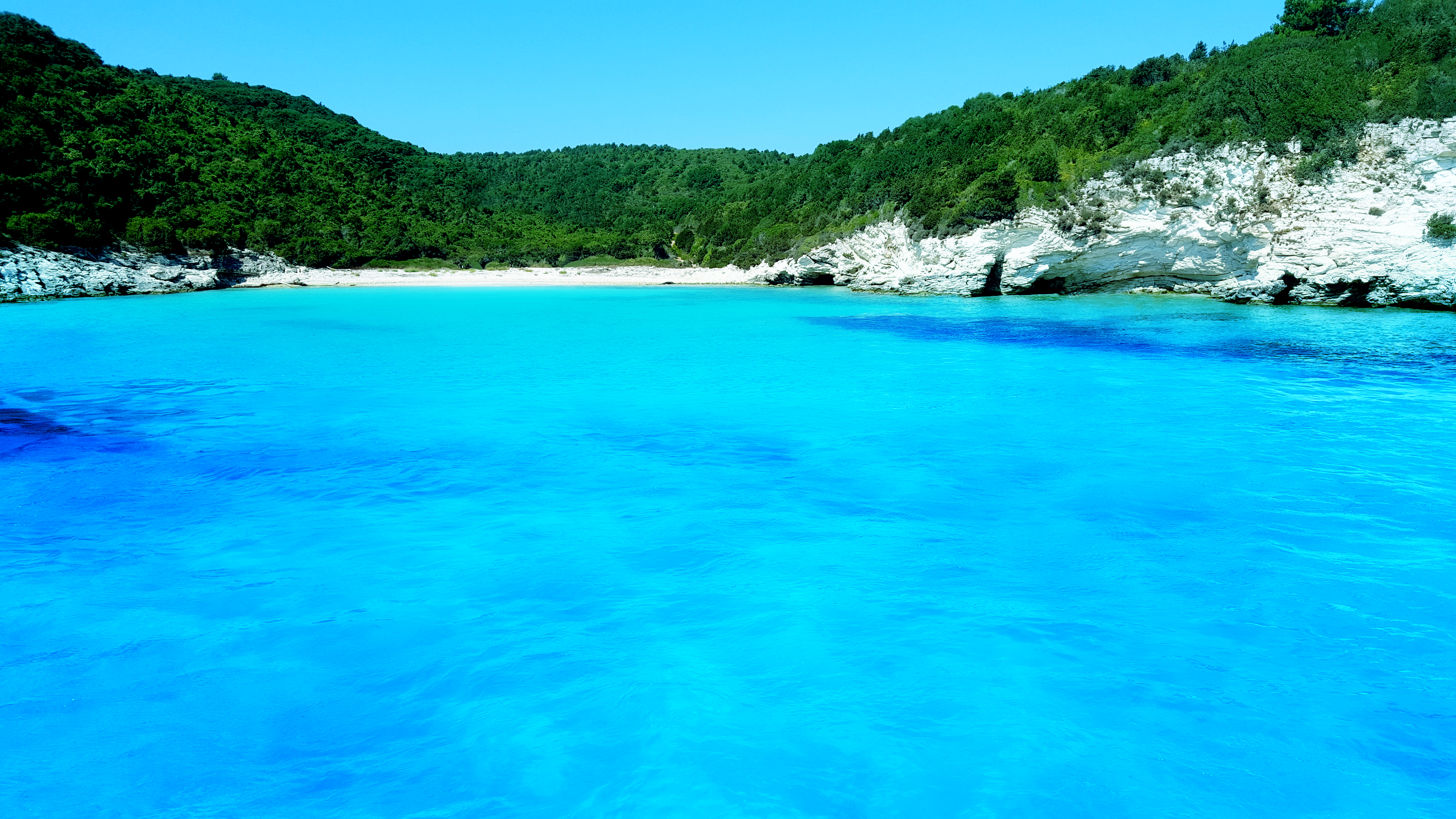
Paxi - Antipaxi coast

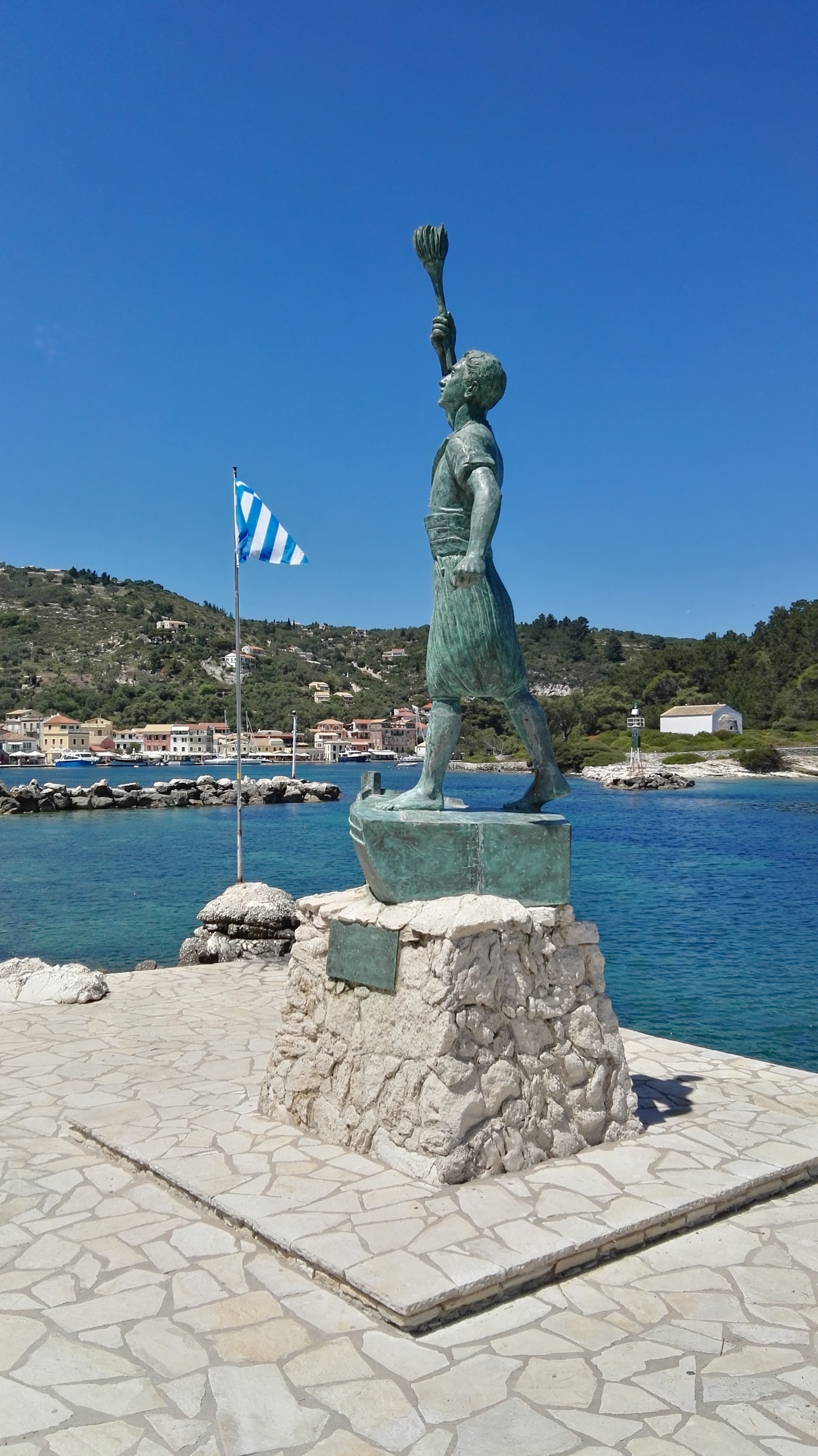
Giorgos Anemogiannis monument 1821
